= A Muppet Family Christmas =

1987 Christmas television special featuring the Muppets

- Based on: The Muppets by Jim Henson
- Written by: Jerry Juhl
- Directed by: Peter Harris
- Starring: Gerry Parkes; Jim Henson; Frank Oz; Jerry Nelson; Richard Hunt; Dave Goelz; Steve Whitmire; Caroll Spinney; Kathryn Mullen; Karen Prell; David Rudman
- Composer: Eric Robertson
- Countries of origin: United States; Canada
- Original language: English

Production
- Executive producer: Jim Henson
- Producers: Martin G. Baker; Diana Birkenfield
- Editor: Gordon Stoddard
- Running time: 52 minutes
- Production company: Jim Henson Productions

Original release
- Network: ABC
- Release: December 16, 1987

A Muppet Family Christmas is a Christmas musical television special starring Jim Henson's Muppets. It first aired on December 16, 1987, on the ABC television network in the United States. Its teleplay was conceived by longtime Muppet writer Jerry Juhl, and directed by Peter Harris. This television special was filmed at 9 Channel Nine Court in Toronto, Ontario. The special features various Muppets from The Muppet Show, Sesame Street, Fraggle Rock, and Muppet Babies. It also stars Gerry Parkes as Doc from the North American wraparound segments of Fraggle Rock, and Henson as himself in a cameo appearance at the end. In the plot, the Muppets surprise Fozzie Bear's mother with a Christmas visit to her farmhouse, unaware of her planned getaway to Malibu.

Due to licensing issues with songs featured in A Muppet Family Christmas, some scenes have been cut from subsequent home media releases.

== Plot ==
Fozzie Bear invites the Muppets to his mother Emily's farm for Christmas, unaware that she has already planned a trip to Malibu and rented out her farmhouse to Doc and Sprocket. The Muppets' arrival cancels her trip and disrupts Doc and Sprocket's plans. Miss Piggy calls Kermit to let him know she will be delayed, leaving Kermit worried that they won't all be able to spend Christmas together. The Swedish Chef invites a turkey to the farmhouse to serve as the Christmas turkey; the turkey tries to avoid him and flirts with Camilla, earning Gonzo's ire. Fozzie builds a snowman that comes to life and performs a music and comedy act with him. The Sesame Street gang arrives singing carols, and perform a Christmas pageant of 'Twas the Night Before Christmas for the others. The Muppets watch some home videos of when they were babies. A sudden snowstorm hits, further delaying Miss Piggy's arrival and leaving Kermit worried for her safety.

The turkey convinces the Chef to try to make a meal out of Big Bird instead; Big Bird, unaware of the Chef's intentions, gives him a gift and cheers him up by singing "The Christmas Song" with him, convincing the Chef to make something else. Fozzie and the Snowman attempt to perform their new comedy act for the other Muppets, but quit after being heckled by Statler and Waldorf, who are friends with Emily. Seeing Kermit worried about Miss Piggy, Doc kindly offers to go out into the storm to look for her. Robin discovers a passage to Fraggle Rock in the basement; he and Kermit venture inside and meet the Fraggles, who share their own holiday traditions.

As the storm lifts, Miss Piggy finally makes her grand entrance on a dogsled with Doc. The Muppets, the Sesame Street gang, and Doc and Sprocket all gather in the living room and sing a medley of carols (except Oscar the Grouch, of course); the Fraggles, hearing the music from below, also join the Muppet family. The Muppets all swap presents, and Doc dresses up as Santa Claus to hand out presents as everyone sings "We Wish You a Merry Christmas". Jim Henson and Sprocket watch from the kitchen while washing dishes. Kermit and Piggy share a kiss under the mistletoe and wish the audience a Merry Christmas along with the rest of the Muppets.

== Songs ==
1. "We Need a Little Christmas" - The Muppets
2. "Jingle Bells" - Kermit and Robin
3. "Jingle Bell Rock" - Dr. Teeth and the Electric Mayhem
4. "Sleigh Ride" - Fozzie and the Snowman
5. "Santa Claus Is Comin' to Town" - The Muppet Babies
6. "Here We Come A-Caroling" - The cast of Sesame Street
7. "Deck the Halls" - The cast of Sesame Street
8. "The Christmas Song" - Big Bird and the Swedish Chef
9. "Pass It On" from Fraggle Rock - The Fraggles
10. "Home for the Holidays" - Miss Piggy, Kermit, and the cast
11. Carol Sing Medley
  - "Happy Holidays" - Full cast
  - "Ding Dong Merrily on High" - Scooter, chickens, and cast
  - "I Saw Three Ships" - Count von Count and cast
  - "Good King Wenceslas" - Gonzo and cast
  - "The Holly and the Ivy" - Janice, Floyd and cast
  - "I'll Be Home for Christmas" - Fozzie and Ma
  - "Happy Holidays" (reprise) - Cast
  - "Have Yourself a Merry Little Christmas" - Kermit and Miss Piggy
  - "Caroling, Caroling" - Snowman, penguins, woodland critters, Bunsen, Beaker, cast
  - "I Heard the Bells on Christmas Day" - Statler and Waldorf
  - "It's in Every One of Us" from John Denver and the Muppets: A Christmas Together - Robin, Kermit, cast
  - "Together at Christmas (Old Friends, New Friends)" from The Christmas Toy - Cast (with solo by Rowlf)
12. "We Wish You a Merry Christmas" - Cast

== Cast ==
- Gerry Parkes as Jerome "Doc" Crystal
- Jim Henson as Himself

=== Muppet performers ===
- Jim Henson as Kermit the Frog, Rowlf the Dog, Dr. Teeth, The Swedish Chef, Waldorf, The Muppet Newsman, Ernie, Guy Smiley, Baby Kermit, Baby Rowlf and a Penguin
- Frank Oz as Miss Piggy, Fozzie Bear, Animal, Sam the Eagle, Bert, Grover, Cookie Monster, Baby Piggy, Baby Fozzie, and Baby Animal
- Jerry Nelson as Robin the Frog, Emily Bear, Floyd Pepper, Count von Count, Camilla the Chicken, Herry Monster, Two-Headed Monster (Left Head), and Gobo Fraggle
- Richard Hunt as Scooter, Janice, Statler, Beaker, Kathleen the Cow, Two-Headed Monster (Right Head), Snowman, and Baby Scooter
- Dave Goelz as Gonzo the Great, Dr. Bunsen Honeydew, Zoot, Beauregard, Boober Fraggle, Uncle Traveling Matt, and Baby Gonzo
- Steve Whitmire as Rizzo the Rat, Lips, Wembley Fraggle, Sprocket the Dog, and Christmas Turkey
- Caroll Spinney as Oscar the Grouch and Big Bird
- Kathryn Mullen as Mokey Fraggle
- Karen Prell as Red Fraggle and Maureen the Mink
- David Rudman as Miss Piggy's Photographer (voice)

== Production ==
This is one of the very few Muppet productions to feature Muppets associated with all four of the major Muppet franchises as a crossover: The Muppet Show, Sesame Street, Fraggle Rock and Muppet Babies (who are seen as actual puppets here instead of animated counterparts). This special also features an onscreen guest cameo by Jim Henson; he can be seen in the kitchen doing dishes with Sprocket towards the end of the special. Additionally, the United Kingdom broadcast which aired on BBC One on 26 December 1989, marked the first appearance of Doc on British television, as the UK version of Fraggle Rock featured new "Outer Space" segments, in which Sprocket's owner was a lighthouse keeper.

== Scenes omitted in North American DVD and VHS release ==
A Muppet Family Christmas has never been released in its entirety on either VHS or DVD in North America. Several songs were licensed specially to only air on TV, and thus had to be cut from home video versions.

- The original opening title (superimposed over a shot of Emily Bear's house).
- The snowman and Fozzie's comedy act while singing the song "Sleigh Ride" when hearing Rowlf inside playing the piano.
- The home movie featuring Kermit the Frog, Miss Piggy, Fozzie, Gonzo and Scooter as babies singing "Santa Claus Is Comin' to Town" with baby Rowlf playing a toy piano.
- The Muppets sing "Home for the Holidays", after Miss Piggy's grand belated arrival, then later "Have Yourself a Merry Little Christmas" and "I Heard the Bells on Christmas Day" during the final medley.
- A brief shot of Fozzie Bear and Elmo lighting a Christmas tree.
- Fozzie tells his mother, Emily Bear, that he is too old to have a stocking hung for him, then changes his mind.

== Reception ==
A Muppet Family Christmas ranked 24th out of 69 shows in the Nielsen ratings the week it aired, with a 16.1 rating and a 25 share, and was watched by around 19.3 million viewers.

TV Guide ranked the special at number six on its '10 Best Family Holiday Specials' list. In his coverage of the special for The A.V. Club, Myles McNutt stated that A Muppet Family Christmas is "a love letter to the Muppets as a wide-ranging, meaningful part of viewers’ childhoods." He further praised the special's emphasis on family and the Muppet characters over "cheap celebrity cameos." Sean Edgar of Paste described the special as "a grand culmination of the altruism that stands at the foundation of Henson’s oeuvre."

== See also ==
- List of Christmas films
