= The Muppets Celebrate Jim Henson =

1990 American television musical special

- Based on: The Muppets by Jim Henson
- Written by: Jerry Juhl; Bill Prady; Sara Luckinson
- Directed by: Don Mischer
- Starring: Dave Goelz; Jerry Nelson; Richard Hunt; Steve Whitmire; Kevin Clash; Kathy Mullen; Frank Oz
- Composer: Larry Grossman
- Country of origin: United States
- Original language: English

Production
- Executive producer: Ritamarie Peruggi
- Producers: Don Mischer; Martin G. Baker; David J. Goldberg
- Editors: Girish Bhargava; David Gumpel
- Running time: 48 minutes
- Production companies: Jim Henson Productions; Walt Disney Television; Don Mischer Productions

Original release
- Network: CBS
- Release: November 21, 1990

The Muppets Celebrate Jim Henson is a one-hour musical special that was produced by Jim Henson Productions, Walt Disney Television and Don Mischer Productions and aired on CBS on November 21, 1990. The program was a tribute to Muppet creator Jim Henson, who had died earlier in 1990 due to toxic shock syndrome caused by a streptococcus infection, and featured characters from The Muppet Show, Fraggle Rock, and Sesame Street.

It marked Steve Whitmire's first official onscreen performance as Kermit the Frog.

== Plot ==
Kermit the Frog is away traveling, leaving Fozzie Bear and the other Muppets in charge of the week's production number. On the day of the show, the Muppets receive a letter from Kermit informing them the production number is meant to pay tribute to Jim Henson, who died about six months earlier. However, the group is unfamiliar with who Henson is. The rest of the special depicts the Muppets figuring out Jim Henson's relation to them, while simultaneously creating the production number.

Through the course of the special, interviews of several special guests are shown (including Carol Burnett, Ray Charles, John Denver, Steven Spielberg, Harry Belafonte and Frank Oz), where each guest recounts their personal experiences with Henson and his contributions to film, television, puppetry and philanthropy.

As the Muppets are nearing the presentation of their Jim Henson tribute number, Fozzie discovers some of Jim Henson's fan mail. One of the letters, which is addressed to Kermit, initially starts out cheerfully, but then reveals that Henson has died, much to the Muppets' shock. They take turns reading different letters from fans. Finally, Fozzie cancels the production number, deeming it improper for the occasion. Kermit's nephew Robin tries to convince Fozzie otherwise by breaking into "Just One Person" (a song which was featured in the 1977 Bernadette Peters episode of The Muppet Show and in Snoopy! The Musical). Eventually, Robin is joined by Scooter, Bean Bunny, Gonzo and Fozzie Bear and the song becomes a large musical number with members of Dr. Teeth and the Electric Mayhem, Beaker characters from Sesame Street and Fraggle Rock joining in. As the Muppets finish singing, Kermit arrives, watches them finish singing and later congratulates the group on a job well done for finding the proper way of honoring Henson. He then decides to enact Fozzie's original number (by saying they should do something silly to end it) and addresses the audience, thanking them and promising "more Muppet stuff because that's the way the boss would want it."

== Cast ==
- Harry Belafonte - himself
- Carol Burnett - herself
- Ray Charles - himself
- John Denver - himself
- Jim Henson - himself (archive footage)
- Frank Oz - himself
- Steven Spielberg - himself

=== Muppet performers ===
- Frank Oz as Fozzie Bear, Miss Piggy, Bert, Grover, Cookie Monster and Animal
- Jerry Nelson as Robin the Frog, Lew Zealand, Announcer, and Floyd Pepper
- Richard Hunt as Scooter, Beaker and Janice
- Dave Goelz as Gonzo the Great, Beauregard, Boober and Zoot
- Steve Whitmire as Kermit the Frog, Rizzo the Rat, Bean Bunny, and Whoopie Cushion
- Kevin Clash as Clifford and Elmo
- Kathryn Mullen as Joy Buzzer and Mokey Fraggle
- Caroll Spinney as Big Bird
- Pam Arciero as Grundgetta

Additional Muppets performed by Camille Bonora, Fran Brill, Jim Martin, Joey Mazzarino, Peter MacKennan, Carmen Osbahr, Martin P. Robinson, David Rudman, Cheryl Henson, and Bill Prady

== Production notes ==
The set used for this special intentionally combines elements from the backstage set used in The Muppet Show and the control room set used in The Jim Henson Hour. The special was later syndicated alongside The Muppet Show.

In later airings, Whitmire's performance of Kermit was redubbed and pitched down for unknown reasons.

This would be one of the last productions Richard Hunt performed Scooter, Beaker and Janice before his death in 1992.

The logo for the special incorporated characters from all three of Henson's most widely known productions, with Kermit, Miss Piggy, and Fozzie joined by Gobo Fraggle and a Doozer from Fraggle Rock, and Cookie Monster from Sesame Street.
