= List of Fraggle Rock characters =

The following characters appear in Fraggle Rock, its animated spin-off, and all related projects.

== Fraggles ==
The Fraggles are anthropomorphic creatures, about 22 in (56 cm) tall, with fur in a wide variety of colors and a tail with a tuft of fur on the end. They live in a network of caves called Fraggle Rock, populated by a variety of creatures, and seeming to connect to at least two different worlds in separate dimensions of time and space. Fraggles spend much of their carefree lives in play, exploring their worlds, and generally enjoying themselves. However, at the same time they maintain a complex culture and society, with each individual having rights and responsibilities. They have basic skill with tools and with rudimentary machinery, and the concept of war is known to them (although wars between Fraggles are very rare). Fraggles live on a diet of vegetables, especially radishes. If individuals touch their heads together before falling asleep they can "share dreams".

=== Principal Fraggles ===
Five fraggles are at the center of the series: Gobo, Mokey, Wembley, Boober and Red. They form a tight-knit group of friends, and each has a distinct personality.

==== Gobo Fraggle ====
Gobo Fraggle (performed by Jerry Nelson in the original live-action series, John Tartaglia in Fraggle Rock: Rock On! and Fraggle Rock: Back to the Rock, voiced by Townsend Coleman in the animated series) is the "leader" of the five main Fraggles. He has the mindset of a young teenager and unusually level-headed and practical for a Fraggle, preferring to control most situations. He plays a guitar (made from a gourd) and often goes on trips to explore the lesser-known tunnels of Fraggle Rock, apparently more out of a sense of obligation to, and admiration for, his Uncle Traveling Matt than from personal inclination, but he nevertheless enjoys these adventures. An unfailing pragmatist, he resists the influence of his friends. Gobo has an orange complexion and purple hair, and wears a yellow sweater with a brown vest: in early episodes he wears a dark magenta cardigan.

During the Outer Space segments (at least in the U.K. version), Gobo is operated by Mike Quinn with Jerry Nelson still performing his voice.

He was designed by Michael K. Frith, and built by Caroly Wilcox and Tim Miller.

==== Mokey Fraggle ====
Mokey Fraggle (performed by Kathryn Mullen in the original series, Donna Kimball in Fraggle Rock: Rock On! and Fraggle Rock: Back to the Rock, voiced by Mona Marshall in the animated series) is a highly spiritual and artistic hippie-type Fraggle who usually remains quiet and contemplative, though even she can get annoyed from time to time. Mokey often enjoys painting and writing poetry, although, according to the episode "Mokey's Funeral", her friends, Gobo, Boober, Wembley, and Red, do not always enjoy listening to her poems, especially ones about death or unusually long ones about friendships. She functions as the optimist of the group, trying to see the best in everyone and everything, and comforting her friends when no such "bright side" can be found. According to episode 15, Mokey can make friends quite easily because of her optimistic personality. Though spiritual and serene, Mokey has the dangerous job of procuring radishes from the Gorgs's garden. Mokey has mauve skin and light blue-green hair. She wears a greyish brown robe-like sweater and later an actual turtleneck sweater underneath the robe-like sweater starting in "The Great Radish Famine." She also wears the pop-top from a soda can as a necklace pendant. Mokey Fraggle's puppet regularly switches back and forth between live hands and rod hands, depending on the requirements of the scene. During those times, Mokey's right hand is usually performed by Trish Leeper. Also, she is the only Fraggle character to have moveable eyelids which open wide when scared, excited, or surprised. Mokey thinks more about the heart and is the oldest of the Fraggle group, serving as a den mother. In one episode, Mokey proved herself worthy of joining Cantus and his minstrels, but ultimately chose to remain with her friends. She was designed by Michael K. Frith, the husband of Mokey's performer Kathryn Mullen, and built by Jan Rosenthal.

==== Wembley Fraggle ====
Wembley Fraggle (performed by Steve Whitmire in the original series, John Tartaglia in Fraggle Rock: Rock On!, Jordan Lockhart in Fraggle Rock: Back to the Rock, voiced by Bob Bergen in the animated series, Frankie Cordero in Fraggle Rock: Rock On!) is Gobo's roommate and best friend. He is the youngest of the Fraggle Five. While kind, he often appears nervous and pathologically wishy-washy; a his name has become Fraggle slang for an indecisive person, while a variant on his name, "Wimble", is used to describe constantly changing points of view. However, his insistence on seeing all sides of a situation is suggested to grant him especially strong empathy. Starting with the episode "The Thirty-Minute Work Week" and in later episodes, Wembley works with the fire department as their siren. Wembley looks greenish-yellow, with yellow hair. He wears a white shirt with palm trees on it (sometimes two identical one, as a gag about his indecisiveness) which he refers to as his "banana tree shirt". As quite a talented percussionist, he often plays bongo drums.

He was designed by Michael K. Frith and built by Rollie Krewson.

==== Boober Fraggle ====
Boober Fraggle (performed by Dave Goelz in the original series, John Tartaglia in Fraggle Rock: Rock On!, Frank Meschkuleit in Fraggle Rock: Back to the Rock, voiced by Rob Paulsen in the animated series, Dave Goelz in Fraggle Rock: Rock On! and Fraggle Rock: Back to the Rock) is the smallest Fraggle and the most intelligent, though unfortunately often depressed and worried as a result. He prefers to live alone and his eyes are usually not visible. Boober almost always expresses a nervous, cautious attitude, and displays hypochondriac tendencies and he deeply ingrained superstitions he struggles to overcome He has so much knowledge that he is actually a capable medic to the other Fraggles, as evidenced in the later seasons. He is fond of cleaning and especially laundry; a running gag depicts him as tending to socks, which no Fraggle visibly wears(he might collect them). Othewiser, Boober is an avid reader, likes to share his talent as a chef, and enjoys playing Blues music with his harmonica. Boober is greenish-blue (befitting his personality) with reddish-orange hair, and usually wears a red hat and brown scarf.

He was designed by Michael K. Frith and built by Leslee Asch.

==== Red Fraggle ====
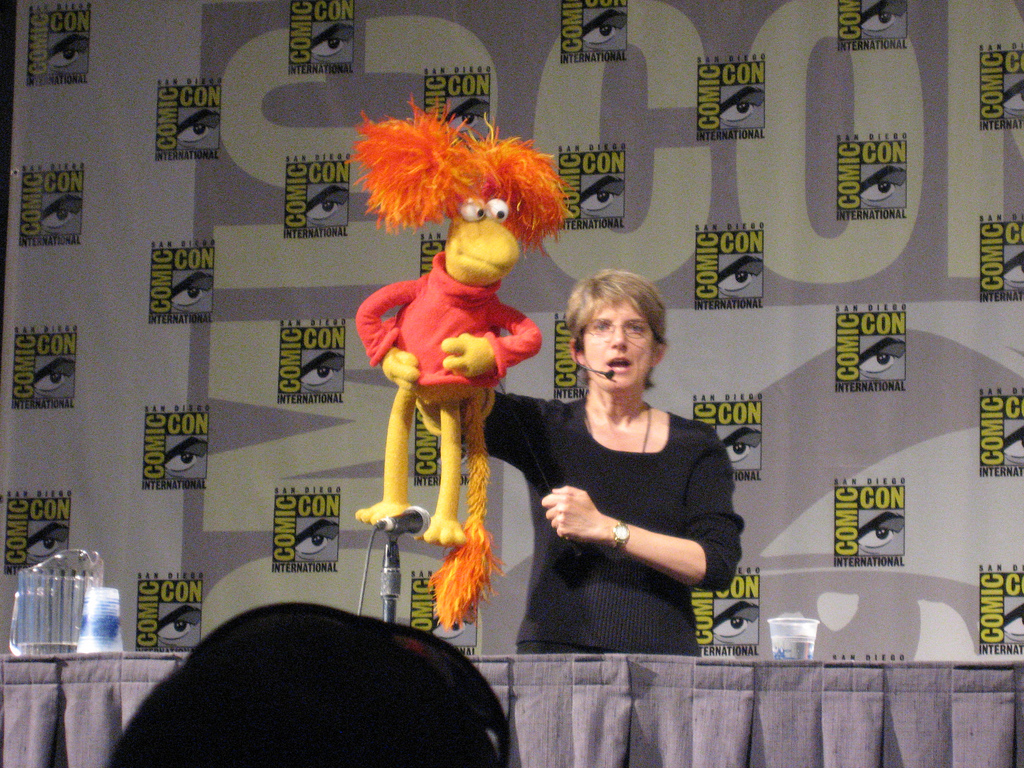
Red and her puppeteer

Red Fraggle (performed by Karen Prell in the original live-action series, and Fraggle Rock: Back to the Rock and voiced by Barbara Goodson in the animated series) has an exuberant and athletic nature in contrast to her best friend Mokey. She is one of the best swimmers among the Fraggles. Red has a yellowish orange hue, red hair, and wears a red sweater. She is also highly cynical of her friends' plans and ideas, and often teases Gobo about his Uncle Traveling Matt (occasionally yawning while he reads the postcards, or incensing Gobo by calling Matt's adventures "Fiction", "Fairy Tales", etc.). While on the surface, she tends to be competitive, stubborn, arrogant, and rather insensitive, on the inside, Red has proven to be one of the friendliest of Fraggles, perhaps second only to Wembley. Red, like Gobo, wants to be in control, and there is often friction between them over who should be the one in charge (although she has admitted she secretly admires Gobo, and the two are mostly playful with each other). During the course of the show, Red and Mokey become roommates; they get off to a rocky start before improving their friendship.

Mo Rocca described her on VH1's I Love the 80s: Strikes Back as the "buck the establishment Fraggle" (comparable to Peppermint Patty of the Peanuts Gang).

She was designed by Michael K. Frith and built by Rollie Krewson.

==== Uncle Traveling Matt ====
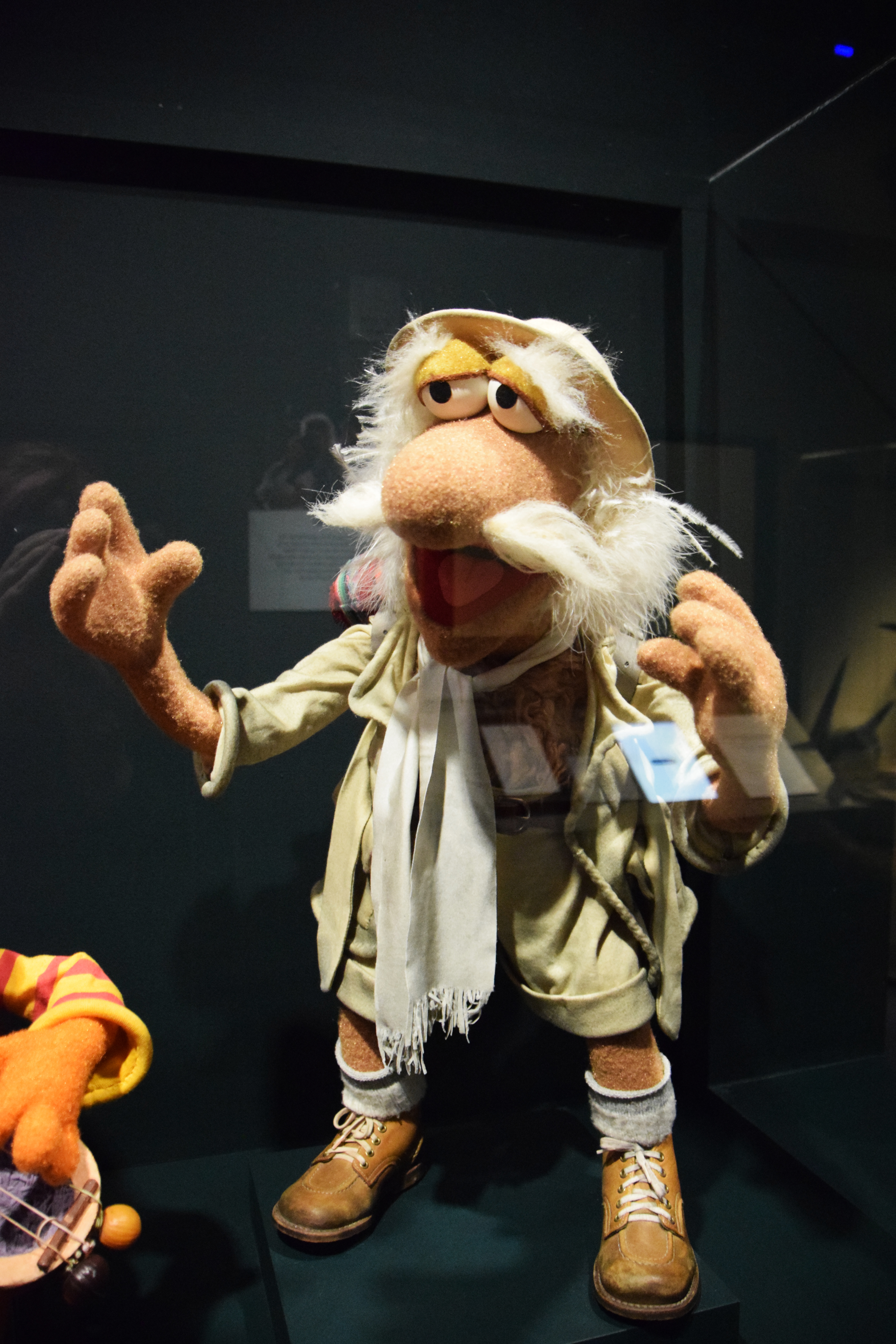
Uncle Traveling Matt

Uncle Traveling Matt (performed by Dave Goelz in the original series, John Tartaglia in Fraggle Rock: Rock On!, Frank Meschkuleit in select episodes of Fraggle Rock: Back to the Rock, Kevin Clash in select episodes of Fraggle Rock: Back to the Rock, voiced by Patrick Pinney in the animated series, Dave Goelz in Fraggle Rock: Rock On! and Fraggle Rock: Back to the Rock) is Gobo's famous (as well as pompous, clumsy, and absent-minded) explorer uncle, who spends most of the series in "Outer Space" (the Fraggles's perspective of the human world) and sends postcards back to his nephew describing his adventures there. He interacts with and often ends up interfering with the daily lives of humans, known to Fraggles as the "Silly Creatures". He sometimes refers to himself as "Matthew": he identifies the room filled with entrances to "Outer Space" as the "T. Matthew Fraggle Room." Matt is well-meaning but clumsy and completely oblivious to the world around him; his woefully incorrect perceptions of the human world provide much of the humor for his character. His name puns on "traveling matte", the "green screen" technique used to produce his film segments.

Uncle Traveling Matt was designed by Michael K. Frith and built by Tim Clarke. Dave Goelz, also the performer of Boober, was cast to play the character.

As a child, Matt was raised by his Uncle Gobo, who resembled an older version of himself. He dreamed of his following in his uncle's footsteps as an explorer, though Uncle Gobo did not approve of Matt's dreams. During a famine in Fraggle Rock, when the Fraggles run out of mushrooms, their primary food source, Matt inadvertently discovered radishes in the Gorgs' garden. By the start of the series, Matt is already a well-known and respected explorer in Fraggle Rock. The first episode begins with him exploring the last uncharted area in the Rock. Here, he discovers an entrance leading into the home of the human Doc. Matt, now choosing to go by the name "Traveling Matt", leaves Fraggle Rock, sending postcards back to Gobo in which he recounts his discoveries in Outer Space. Gobo must journey into Outer Space, and get past Doc's dog Sprocket, in order to retrieve these postcards. Matt remains in Outer Space for most of the series, only occasionally returning to Fraggle Rock. This changes in the episode "Uncle Matt's Discovery", when Matt discovers a cave he names the T. Matthew Fraggle Room, which contains a number of portals that lead to various locations in Outer Space. While he continues his explorations in Outer Space, Matt returns to Fraggle Rock more often from this point on, telling Gobo of his exploits in person instead of sending postcards.

In a 2006 interview, Matt's performer Dave Goelz discussed the three character flaws that define Matt's personality: his misperception, his clumsiness (created by Goelz to make taping Matt's segments more interesting), and his denial of the first two flaws. As Goelz later said in a 2011 interview: “The original concept for him was that he went out and misinterpreted everything and then sent postcards back that we saw on video, where he described the outside world in a distorted way. I just didn't think it was very funny, so I started adding two other components. I started adding clumsiness so he was also physically an inept explorer. And then I added this emotional disconnect. So when he wrote back to his nephew, he would say, "I decided to leave the shop." In actuality, you see him being drop-kicked out of the place and flying through the air and hitting a wall. That aesthetic started to become part of the material, and it was written in as we developed it."

Uncle Traveling Matt has made several cameo appearances in Muppet productions, being the only Fraggle (although not the only Fraggle Rock character) to do so. He appeared as a guest at Kermit and Miss Piggy's wedding in The Muppets Take Manhattan, and also appeared in The Muppets: A Celebration of 30 Years. He also appeared, along with the other Fraggles, in the 1987 TV special A Muppet Family Christmas. Dave Goelz vocally reprised his role as Matt for the 2020 short-form TV series Fraggle Rock: Rock On!, produced for Apple TV+, while John Tartaglia performed the puppetry. In Fraggle Rock: Back to the Rock, Goelz once again provided Matt's voice, with Frank Meschkuleit and Kevin Clash alternating the puppetry.

=== Other Fraggles ===
- Ancient Fraggles - The Ancient Fraggles are a tribe of extinct Fraggles that were seen in "The Terrible Tunnel" and "Mokey, Then and Now." Back then, Fraggles had leaders and did not have hair on their heads. Mokey, Wembley, and Boober ended up somewhere back in time where the Ancient Fraggles mistook Mokey as the legendary Blundig (who Mokey was dressed as when she, Wembley, and Boober were rehearsing a play about Blundig).
  - Fishface Fraggle (performed by Jerry Nelson) - The autocratic ruler of the Ancient Fraggles.
  - Bigmouth Fraggle (performed by Bob Stutt) - An Ancient Fraggle that speaks a lot.
  - Bonehead Fraggle (performed by Cheryl Wagner) - An Ancient Fraggle with a bone through her nose. She tends to repeat every phrase Fishface Fraggle says.
  - Noodlenose Fraggle (performed by Tim Gosley) - An Ancient Fraggle with a noodle-shaped accessory on his nose that is amused a lot and often ends up in the Ancient Fraggles' prison since being amused back then was a bad thing.
- Archivist (performed by Aymee Garcia, voiced by Cynthia Erivo) - A Fraggle who is the keeper of all important treasures of the Fraggles.
- Aunt Granny Fraggle (performed by Trish Leeper) - A bespectacled Fraggle. She appeared in "Gobo's Discovery" where she tries to entice the other Fraggles into joining her on a picnic.
- Barry Blueberry (performed by John Tartaglia) - A genial commentator for the Giggle Gaggle Games in the titular Fraggle Rock: Back to the Rock episode.
- Brio the Minstrel (performed by Terry Angus in the original series, Kira Hall in Fraggle Rock: Back to the Rock) - A Fraggle who is one of the Minstrels following Cantus. Brio is a bespectacled Fraggle who plays the cymbals. According to puppeteer Terry Angus, Brio is also the only female minstrel, conceived by Jocelyn Stevenson to balance the gender ratio. She first appeared in the Fraggle Rock episode "The Minstrels." In Fraggle Rock: Back to the Rock, Brio has been redesigned and now plays a small keyboard in the Troubadours. She was designed by Michael K. Frith and built by Jane Gootnick.
- Cantus the Minstrel (performed by Jim Henson in the original series, voiced by Bob Bergen in the animated series) - A Fraggle who continually travels to different parts of the cave, and stops several times at Fraggle Rock. Cantus encourages the Fraggles to find their own songs, which culminate in "Our melody/come and sing it with me/It's a song where you know you'll belong.../'Cause you know we belong to the song."
- Cave Fraggles – Deep in the caves of Fraggle Rock lives another group of Fraggles that are known to other Fraggles as Cave Fraggles (as shown in the episode "Fraggle Wars"). Enemy Fraggles live in a place they call Fraggle Cave. The Enemy Fraggles are dull and seem to be a lot like Boober, in that they share his pessimistic attitude and dislike of most forms of fun.
  - The Cave's Oldest Fraggle (performed by Tim Gosley) - The elder of the Cave Fraggles. She urges her group of Cave Fraggles on to combat against the opposition as seen in "Fraggle Wars." Ultimately, humor prevails, and both Cave's Oldest and World's Oldest can only express disdain for modern youth.
  - Beige Fraggle (performed by Richard Hunt) - One of the Cave Fraggles from the second season Fraggle Rock episode "Fraggle Wars". He is in charge of guarding Mokey when she is captured and kept prisoner in a cage. Beige tries very hard to be a tough, efficient Security Fraggle, but secretly begins to feel sorry for Mokey. When war threatens to break out between the Cave Fraggles and the Rock Fraggles, Beige finds the courage to help Mokey and, with Red's help, stop the battle before it starts. Like Red, however, his name is the same as his color, except his is the same color as his skin, and Red's is the same as her hair. While Mokey was being kept in the cage, she and Beige discussed the differences between their two cultures. Beige demonstrates the Cave Fraggles' unique sense of humor with the song "Ho Ho Ho (What a Funny World It Is)." One joke they find particularly amusing goes, "I met a man who had a son, he also had a daughter too!"
- Chuchu Fraggle – Appeared in "Playing Till It Hurts" and has extremely large, yellow teeth, which are knocked out in the course of the episode. He played first base on Rumpel Fraggle's rock hockey team and was an aggressive player. Despite his teeth being knocked out, he continued to play.
- Convincing John (performed by Jim Henson) - An evangelist-like Fraggle, uses his fast-talking musical numbers to convince Fraggles to do anything, from getting Red to wear a blindfold to getting all Fraggles to stop eating Doozer constructions (and, subsequently, to start eating them again). "He could convince a Gorg that he's a Doozer!" Convincing John lives some distance away from the rest of the Fraggles: it is suggested that this status is something akin to exile, or quarantine, given Convincing John's propensity to convince people to do things at random. He does, however, have a trio of backing singers/dancers who are almost his acolytes, though when not performing, they are aware of his true nature and are less than impressed. In "The Secret Society of the Poobahs", Convincing John was the Vanguard of the Poobahs. In the same episode, Convincing John did not know the difference between guilty and innocent. He was designed by Amy Van Gilder and assisted in building him by Rollie Krewson. Convincing John's Vanguard outfit was created by Jim Henson.
  - Fragglettes (performed by Dave Goelz, Richard Hunt, and Kathryn Mullen, singing voice provided by Sharon Lee Williams) - Three female Fraggles who are Convincing John's back-up singers.
- Craggles - Debuting in Fraggle Rock: Back to the Rock, the Craggles are a type of Fraggle that have smooth hair, drass in monotone-style clothes, have a heavily sleepy demeanor where they often play in their dream-space, and don't have baloobiuses.
  - Kyle Craggle (performed by Dan Garza)
  - Lyle Craggle (performed by John Tartaglia, voiced by Ed Helms) - A Craggle in brown clothes.
  - Styles Craggle (performed by Aymee Garcia)
- Dimpley Fraggle – There were two different Fraggles who were named Dimpley. Both versions of Dimpley were seen in the backgrounds of the other episodes.
  - Dimpley Fraggle #1 – The first Dimpley Fraggle is a girl with pigtails who raced against Gobo in "Wembley and the Great Race."
  - Dimpley Fraggle #2 – The second Dimpley Fraggle was on Rumple Fraggle's rock hockey team.
- Eminent and Venerable Council of Sages - A council composed of the first three Fraggles to show up for a hearing when a hearing is called. Red brings Mokey before the council when she mistakenly thinks Mokey has stolen her radish bars as seen in "Red-Handed and the Invisible Thief;" on that day, the council is composed of the level-headed Lambo (performed by Richard Hunt), the dopey Hambo (performed by Steve Whitmire), and an unnamed sleeping female Fraggle (voiced by Sharon Lee Williams).
- Feenie Fraggle (performed by Jerry Nelson) - A good-natured, but rather slow-witted Fraggle who is the best friend of Large Marvin Fraggle.
- Felix the Fearless (performed by Bob Stutt) - A tan Fraggle with green and gray hair who serves as head of the Fraggle Rescue Squad. He possesses a high-pitched voice which contrasts with his name and reputation (as well as his oversized outfit), and values bureaucracy over practical methods. He appeared in "Marooned" and "Wembley's Wonderful Whoopie Water."
- Fire Chief Fraggle (performed by Richard Hunt) - The leader of the Fraggle Rock Volunteer Fire Department, and swears Wembley in as a new member, allowing him to be the siren. Like the other members, Firechief Fraggle doesn't know how to start a fire.
  - Clerk Fraggle (performed by Dave Goelz) - He is responsible for taking attendance at the meetings of the Fraggle Rock Volunteer Fire Department as seen in the episode "The Thirty-Minute Work Week."
- Gillis Fraggle (performed by Richard Hunt) - A lavender Fraggle with green hair. He wears a black jacket and a pair of half-moon glasses. Gillis is the resident musician of Fraggle Rock. But unlike the Minstrels, he lives in the Rock full-time. His first appearance was in the episode "Uncle Matt Comes Home" where he conducts a song to welcome Uncle Traveling Matt back to Fraggle Rock and even conducts the Fraggle Choir. In "The Secret Society of Poobahs", Gillis was the Beggler-Beg of the Poobahs. Gillis' name is a reference to Fraggle Rock music arranger Don Gillis.
- Harmer Fraggle - A Fraggle who plays the forward on Rumple Fraggle's rock hockey team as seen in "Playing Till It Hurts."
- Herkimer Fraggle (performed by Richard Hunt) - A Fraggle who serves as the property caretaker of Rhyming Rock.
- Icy Joe (performed by Karen Prell) - Exclusive to Fraggle Rock: Back to the Rock, Icy Joe is a famed Fraggle explorer with an icy personality and is larger than normal Fraggles. Gobo and Wembley found frozen Icy Joe in a block of ice in an icy cavern. After Gobo helps Icy Joe get rid of her icy personality, Icy Joe becomes a member of the Wise Council of Fraggles as seen in later episodes. She was built by Sierra Schoening and the eye mechanisms are provided by Tom Newby.
- Jamdolin (performed by Andy Heyward, voiced by Daveed Diggs) - The frontman for the Troubadours who is exclusive to Fraggle Rock: Back to the Rock. He looks like Cantus the Minstrel and plays the mandolin.
- Large Marvin Fraggle (performed by Dave Goelz in the original series, Frank Meschkuleit in Fraggle Rock: Back to the Rock) - A large, fat, and somewhat dimwitted Fraggle who loves snacking and also swimming. He is a long-time nemesis of Red Fraggle as he is the opposite of Red's personality (besides their love for swimming).
- Lost Fraggles - A lost tribe of Fraggles that live in Lost Fraggle Rock as seen in Fraggle Rock: Back to the Rock.
  - Lost Fraggle Leader (performed by Kira Hall, voiced by Catherine O'Hara) - The unnamed leader of the Lost Fraggles and a counterpart of Gobo.
  - Slowpokey (performed by Aymee Garcia) - A member of the Lost Fraggles and a counterpart of Mokey.
  - Wrigley (performed by Andy Heyward) - A member of the Lost Fraggles and a counterpart of Wembley.
  - Soupey (performed by Ali J. Eisner) - A member of the Lost Fraggles and a counterpart of Boober.
  - Run and Jump (performed by Ingrid Hansen) - A member of the Lost Fraggles and a counterpart of Red.
- Lou "Louise" Fraggle (performed by Cheryl Wagner) - A helpful, considerate Fraggle from Gobo's bowling team who becomes Wembley's girlfriend in the episode "We Love You Wembley". Outside of some occasional background scenes in other episodes, Louise made a brief speaking cameo in "The Secret Society of Poohbahs" where she served as one of the guards.
- Marley Fraggle (performed by Karen Prell) - A Fraggle that was around during Uncle Traveling Matt's childhood.
- Marlon Fraggle (performed by Steve Whitmire) - An odd-looking Fraggle, resembles Peter Lorre. He wants to form a cult, has "ideas about behavioural modification" (as seen in "The Finger of Light") and carves a sculpture out of radishes for his turn as Moon Greeter (as seen in "Capturing the Moon").
- Morris Fraggle (performed by Terry Angus) - A bespectacled Fraggle who appeared in the background of most episodes. Terry Angus had to put some glasses on Morris Fraggle so that he can easily locate Morris in the monitors during filming.
- Noble Fraggle – There were two different Fraggles who were named Noble.
  - Noble Fraggle #1 – The first Noble Fraggle appeared in "Wembley and the Great Race" where he raced against Gobo and Wembley.
  - Noble Fraggle #2 – The second Noble Fraggle appeared in "Playing Till It Hurts" where he played on Rumple Fraggle's rock hockey team.
- Old Gypsy Lady (performed by Kathryn Mullen) - An only gypsy lady in Fraggle Rock and walks with a wooden leg and a squeaky shoe. Boober pretends to be the Old Gypsy Lady when Sidebottom comes along to try to convince him to have some fun. However, he is caught in his lie when, at the end, the Gypsy Lady arrives.
- Pedley Fraggle (performed by Mike Peterson) - A Fraggle that appeared in "A Brush with Jealousy."
- Phil Fraggle (performed by Steve Whitmire, voiced by Phil Balsam) - A bespectacled Fraggle musician.
- The Pipebangers - Fraggles who come out after the King Gorg takes his daily bath and empties the Fraggle's pond, sing and repeatedly bang on the pipes in the wall until the pond fills with water again. The Pipebangers appeared in the episode "Let the Water Run".
  - Archbanger Fraggle (performed by Jerry Nelson in the original series, voiced by Bob Bergen in the animated series) - The head of the Pipebangers, who have the job of refilling the Fraggle Pond with water when it runs low. He does this by leading the Pipebangers in a ritual that involves striking the pipes in Fraggle Rock with sticks. The noisy pipes lead Doc to believe that there is a problem with his boiler, which he consequently empties. The Fraggles, however, believe the appearance of water to be magically related to the Pipebangers' actions. In his only appearance in "Let the Water Run," the Archbanger Fraggle is shocked when the water doesn't flow out of the pipes, despite repeated banging. He is unaware that Doc is fixing his boiler at the time. When Red brings back an umbrella from Doc's Workshop, the Archbanger insists on using it to bang on the pipes, claiming, "I know a sacred banging stick when I see one." Doc turns his boiler on at the very moment that the Archbanger begins to strike the pipes with the umbrella, and the Fraggles' faith in the pipe-banging ritual is restored. He also appeared in the animated version of Fraggle Rock in the episode "Mokey's Flood of Creativity." For the 100th pipe-banging, the Archbanger wants a special ceremony and is persuaded to allow Mokey to recite a poem for the occasion. The recitation, or so the Fraggles assume, is the cause of a flood which spreads throughout the cavern. The Archbanger re-appeared in "The Great Fraggle Freeze."
- Pogey (performed by Kanja Chen) - An excitable and clueless non-binary Fraggle.
- Pryce (performed by John Tartaglia, voiced by Brett Goldstein) - Exclusive to Fraggle Rock: Back to the Rock, Pryce comes from a distant part of Fraggle Rock.
- Rathbone Fraggle - An elderly Fraggle that debuts in "Wembley & the Bemble." It was mentioned in Storyteller Fraggle's tale of the Bemble that Rathbone Fraggle disappeared when fighting the Bemble. Wembley encounters Rathbone when he mistook him for the Bemble.
- Rock Hockey Hannah (performed by Kathryn Mullen) - A Fraggle who is Red Fraggle's role model and a famous sports figure in Fraggle Rock. She appeared in "Playing Till It Hurts" where she attended a Rock Hockey Game where Red was supposed to play in until she injured herself and took the place of one of the teammates. She did congratulate Red when she knew when to give up when Red got even more injured during the game.
- Rumple Fraggle (performed by Gord Robertson) - A friend of Large Marvin who wears an aviator's hat and goggles. In "Wembley and the Great Race", Rumple bets Boober Fraggle radishes on who they think will win the race. In "Playing Till It Hurts", Rumple is the coach of the rock hockey team called the Roustabouts.
- Rupert (performed by Andy Heyward) - A Fraggle who appears in the Fraggle Rock: Back to the Rock episode "The Legendy of Icy Joe".
- Sherry Contrary (performed by Aymee Garcia) - A Fraggle who appears in the Fraggle Rock: Back to the Rock episode "The Twisty-Turny-Thon".
- Sidebottom (performed by Dave Goelz) – Functions as Boober's alter ego. He is funny, loud, and messy, unlike Boober. He sometimes appears during Boober's dreams and causes problems.
- Sir Blunderbrain (performed by Steve Whitmire) - Sir Blunderbrain is a brave Fraggle who appeared in a legend told in the Fraggle Rock episode "The Terrible Tunnel". According to the Storyteller Fraggle, Sir Blunderbrain ventured into the Terrible Tunnel but "never came home again."
- Storyteller Fraggle (performed by Richard Hunt in the first appearance, Terry Angus in later appearances for the original series, Donna Kimball in Fraggle Rock: Back to the Rock, voiced by Stu Rosen in the animated series) - Storyteller Fraggle lives somewhere in the Fraggle tunnels and tells the Fraggles the story of the Terrible Tunnel. She has an infatuation with Gobo's Uncle Traveling Matt which comes to light while she is telling the story of Uncle Matt's first adventure.
- Tosh Fraggle (performed by Trish Leeper) - A friend of Boober Fraggle. She has a pet beast named Beastie.
- Uncle Gobo (performed by Jerry Nelson) - Uncle Traveling Matt's uncle, Gobo's great-uncle, and the greatest Fraggle explorer only seen in flashbacks as seen in "Born to Wander" and "The Riddle of Rhyming Rock."
- Wimple Fraggle (performed by Kathryn Mullen) - A Fraggle that was around during Uncle Traveling Matt's childhood.
- The Wizard (performed by Richard Hunt) - The Wizard is a supposed master of prestidigitation who visits Fraggle Rock occasionally to show off his magic tricks, which include the "Blooming Flower" trick and the "Double Twisted Over Back Flip While Escaping from Ropes and Waiting to Be Eaten While You're All Tied Up" trick. He is also fond of using smoke pellets to create the illusion of magic happening when he really hasn't done anything. The Wizard's incantation while performing magic is "Horse enchiladas, ho-ho!" Without his glasses and false beard, the Wizard closely resembles Wembley Fraggle. In the second season episode "The Wizard of Fraggle Rock", he fools Wembley into switching places with him. Wembley wants the other Fraggles to give him attention and praise; the Wizard hopes to escape from the Poison Cackler that is pursuing him.
  - 7-Words-Max (performed by Dave Goelz) - The Wizard's lackey who is easily excited and loves to boast about the Wizard's accomplishments.
- The World's Oldest Fraggle (performed by Dave Goelz in the original series, Frank Meschkuliet in Fraggle Rock: Back to the Rock, voiced by Bob Bergen in the animated series, Dave Goelz in Fraggle Rock: Back to the Rock) - The World's Oldest Fraggle serves as elder for the Fraggles, often officiating at ceremonial events and emergency meetings. He first appears in the episode "The Finger of Light." The World's Oldest Fraggle is obviously greatly respected by the Fraggles, but he's not their leader. His role seems to be mostly ceremonial; he presides over games and leads meetings a lot, but he doesn't make rules for anyone.
  - Henchy Fraggle (performed by John Pattison in the original series, Aymee Garcia in Fraggle Rock: Back to the Rock, voiced by Rob Paulsen in the animated series) - Henchy acts as assistant to the World's Oldest Fraggle. His role is to correct The World's Oldest Fraggle and then get hit with his cane after he exclaims "I know that!"

== Doozers ==
Within Fraggle Rock lives a second species of small humanoid creatures, the pudgy, green, ant-like Doozers. Standing only 6 inches (15 cm) tall (knee-high to a Fraggle), Doozers in a sense represent anti-Fraggles; their lives are dedicated to work and industry. Doozers spend much of their time busily constructing all manner of scaffolding throughout Fraggle Rock using miniature construction equipment and wearing hard-hats and work boots. No one but the Doozers themselves seem to understand the actual purpose of their intricate and beautiful constructions.

Often they accompany their building with marching songs and various Doozer chants. To ensure that they always have a steady stream of work to do, Doozers build their constructions out of an edible candy-like substance (manufactured from radishes) which is greatly enjoyed by Fraggles. They actually want the Fraggles to eat their constructions because "architecture's supposed to be enjoyed" and also so they can go on to build again. This is essentially the only interaction between Doozers and Fraggles; Doozers spend most of their time building, and Fraggles spend much of their time eating Doozer buildings. They thus form an odd sort of symbiosis. In one episode, the flavor of the Doozer sticks is augmented by adding other flavors, such as tomato and mustard.

This symbiosis becomes integral to the episode "The Preachification of Convincing John" where Mokey calls upon the Fraggles to stop eating the Doozers' constructions—because they spend so much time making them. Fraggle Rock quickly fills with constructions and the Doozers have no space left in which to build. After running out of space, the Doozers finally decide to move on to a new area because the Fraggles won't eat their constructions, and there is even a tragic scene with a mother explaining to her daughter that Doozers must build or they will die, and so they must find a new place to live where they can build and hopefully find Fraggles who will eat their constructions. Overhearing this, Mokey realizes that she has inadvertently disrupted a vital symbiotic relationship through ignorant good intentions. As a result, Mokey frantically rescinds her prohibition and encourages the Fraggles to gorge on the structures – just in time to persuade the Doozers to stay.

At one point a series of Fraggle Rock books appeared, one titled The Legend of the Doozer Who Didn't. This book details the story of a Doozer who went against Doozer tradition when he stopped working and going to school. According to this book, a Doozer who does not "do" becomes a Fraggle – though "All Work and All Play", a second-season episode of the show, unmasks this as merely a story that Doozer parents tell their children to teach them the value of hard work: no Doozer seriously believes it.

The series had several episodes that featured a young female Doozer named Cotterpin as a main character.

All of the Doozers were designed by Michael K. Frith and their mechanical bodies were built by Faz Fazakas.

- Angle Doozer
- Architect Doozer (performed by Jerry Nelson in the original series, John Tartaglia in Fraggle Rock: Back to the Rock, voiced by Townsend Coleman in the animated series) - The designer of all of the Doozers' constructions. He also becomes Cotterpin's mentor in the episode "All Work and All Play".
- Board Doozer -
- Bolt Doozer - Bolt Doozer debuted in the episode "The Great Radish Roundup" where he was among the Doozers that were displeased that the Gorgs had replaced their radish crops with Banoony Berries.
- Bulldoozer (performed by Tim Gosley) -
- Cotterpin Doozer (performed by Kathryn Mullen in the original series, Donna Kimball in Fraggle Rock: Back to the Rock, voiced by Mona Marshall in the animated series) - A rather rebellious young Doozer who has a stubborn streak. She hates working and building (unlike the other Doozers) and states she would rather be a Fraggle. Cotterpin enjoys drawing, and actually was able to become Architect's apprentice. Though seen as a Baby Doozer in "The Great Radish Famine", she was introduced in "All Work and All Play" when she rejected the pressure placed on her to take the helmet, and ran away to become a Fraggle. Cotterpin met and befriended Red Fraggle at this time, though Cotterpin finally realized that she couldn't become a Fraggle since she can't do what Red Fraggle could do. However, Architect Doozer understood her plight, as he himself was once in her shoes, and allowed her to "take the drawing board" rather than the helmet. She still maintains a friendship with Red, Wembley, and Boober.
- Crosscut Doozer (performed by Kathryn Mullen) - A Doozer welder and a member of Flange's work team.
- Crusty Doozer (performed by Steve Whitmire) - He was originally one of the Doozers left behind in the Cavern of Lost Dreams (the original Doozer Cave) alongside Yeaster Doozer.
- Derrick Doozer -
- Dr. Level (performed by Frank Meschkuleit) - Dr. Level is a Doozer therapist.
- Drillbit Doozer - Drillbit was mentioned by Cotterpin in the episode "Boober and the Glob."
- Flex Doozer (performed by Richard Hunt) - Flex gets covered by Boober's lucky hat in the episode "You Can't Do That Without a Hat."
- Flange Doozer (performed by Steve Whitmire in the original series, voiced by Patrick Pinney in the animated series) - Flange is Cotterpin's father and often works as a Doozer foreman.
- Granny Cantilever Doozer - The grandmother of Cotterpin Doozer and mother of Wingnut Doozer.
- Hammerhead Doozer -
- Jack Hammer Doozer (performed by Ali J. Eisner and voiced by Kenan Thompson) - A persuasive Doozer.
- Judge Gavel Doozer (performed by Karen Prell) - Judge Gavel Doozer presides over Cotterpin's trial as seen in "The Trial of Cotterpin Doozer."
  - Bailiff Doozer (performed by Mike Peterson) - He works for Judge Gavel Doozer and is involved in Cotterpin's trial as seen in "The Trial of Cotterpin Doozer."
- Lock Doozer - Lock is one of the Doozers eaten by The Glob.
- Lugnut Doozer (voiced by Bob Bergen) - Lugnut debuted in the episode "What the Doozers Did". He and Rhinestone Doozer objected to what he perceived as Cotterpin Doozer's failure to have the glue for one of the Doozer Constructions be sticky enough as Cotterpin was working on her first floating Doozer Construction. He and Rhinestone changed their minds when the floodwaters came into Fraggle Rock.
- Measure Doozer (performed by Kira Hall) - Measure Doozer is an efficient Doozer who appears in Fraggle Rock: Back to the Rock.
- Modem Doozer (performed by Karen Prell) - Modem is Wrench Doozer's mother and an occasional Doozer forewoman, which at least once led to a rivalry with Flange.
- Periscope Doozer (performed by Dan Garza) - Periscope is a Doozer who appears in the Fraggle Rock: Back to the Rock episode "This and That" to inspect the surface of the Gorgs' garden.
- Protractor Doozer - Protractor debuted in the episode "The Great Radish Roundup." He serves as the Doozers' mathematician where he calculates on how many Banoony Berries it would take to make the Gorgs sick of them.
- Research and Development (performed by Aymee Garcia and Jordan Lockhart) - Research and Development are two Doozer scientists who appear in the Fraggle Rock: Back to the Rock episode "The Repeatee Birds".
- Rhinestone Doozer (voiced by Rob Paulsen) - Rhinestone debuted in the episode "What the Doozers Did". He and Lugnut Doozer objected to what he perceived as Cotterpin Doozer's failure to have the glue for one of the Doozer Constructions be sticky enough as Cotterpin was working on her first floating Doozer Construction. He and Lugnut changed their minds when the floodwaters came into Fraggle Rock.
- Rotary Doozer (performed by Sandra Shamas)
- Scoop Doozer - Scoop is a Doozer who appears in the second season Fraggle Rock episode "Doozer Is As Doozer Does". Scoop is one of Turbo Doozer's cronies, who helps pressure Wrench Doozer into flooping, against his own judgment.
- Spanner Doozer (performed by Bailey Sweetapple)
- Tumbrell Doozer (performed by Gord Robertson) - Tumbrell is a Doozer who tries to get Judge Gavel Doozer to get rid of Cotterpin as Architect Doozer's apprentice as seen in "The Trial of Cotterpin Doozer."
- Turbo Doozer (performed by Richard Hunt in the original series, Ali J. Eisner in Fraggle Rock: Back to the Rock) - Turbo introduces Wrench to flooping, which is a dangerous pastime because it causes hiccups, a potentially disastrous condition for Doozers given their small size.
- Tweezer Doozer - Tweezer is a Doozer who works at Turbo's team, which was Tower Team F, until the Architect Doozer made it Support Squad A.
- Wingnut Doozer (performed by Karen Prell in the original series, voiced by Barbara Goodson in the animated series) - Wingnut is Cotterpin's mother and Flange's wife.
- Wrench Doozer (performed by Dave Goelz in the original series, Andy Heyward in Fraggle Rock: Back to the Rock, voiced by Townsend Coleman in the animated series) - Wrench is Cotterpin's best friend and Modem Doozer's son.
- Yeaster Doozer (performed by Sandra Shamas) - Yeast is one of the Doozers originally left behind in the Cavern of Lost Dreams (the original Doozer Cave) alongside Crusty Doozer.

== Gorgs ==
On the outside of another exit from Fraggle Rock through a well live a family of Gorgs, giant furry humanoids standing 15 feet (4.6 m) tall. The Gorgs consider themselves to be the King and Queen of the Universe, but to all appearances, seem to be working as simple farmers, with a hut and garden patch. The second episode of the first season reveals that the Gorgs have never actually met anyone besides themselves in years ("I've never met a real subject before!"), suggesting that King and Queen of the Universe are self-bestowed titles. The Gorgs regard Fraggles as pests, which steal radishes from their garden. In one episode, it is revealed that the Gorgs use radishes to make "anti-vanishing cream" that prevents them from becoming invisible. So the three main races of the Fraggle Rock universe – Fraggles, Doozers and Gorgs – are all dependent on the radishes for different reasons. While the King and Queen consider the Fraggles disgusting vermin, Junior enjoys chasing, catching and keeping them like a boy would keep lizards and bugs. Junior has no friends, and perhaps pursues the Fraggles just so he has someone to talk to.

- Pa Gorg (performed by Gord Robertson for the body in the original series, Andy Heyward for the body in Fraggle Rock: Back to the Rock, Jerry Nelson for the voice and face in the original series, Frank Meschkuleit for the voice and face in Fraggle Rock: Back to the Rock, voiced by Patrick Pinney in the animated series) - The self-proclaimed King of the Universe.
- Ma Gorg (performed by Trish Leeper in the original series, Ingrid Hansen in Fraggle Rock: Back to the Rock, Myra Fried for the face and voice in 1983, Cheryl Wagner for the face and voice in 1984–1987 for the original series, Aymee Garcia for the face, voice in Fraggle Rock: Back to the Rock and voiced by Patricia Parris in the animated series) is the self-proclaimed Queen of the Universe. Whenever the Fraggles comes into her view, Ma Gorg would scream, thus causing Pa Gorg and Junior Gorg to try to catch the Fraggles or drive them away.
- Junior Gorg (performed by Rob Mills for the body in Seasons 1–4, Frank Meschkuleit for the body in Season 5, Ben Durocher for the body in Fraggle Rock: Back to the Rock, Richard Hunt for the face and voice in the original series, Dan Garza for the face and voice in Fraggle Rock: Back to the Rock, voiced by Michael Laskin in the animated series) is the son of Pa and Ma Gorg who serves as the Prince of the Universe and the heir apparent to the Gorg crown. Junior would always try to catch the Fraggles, which does not go well most of the time.
- Princess Gorg (performed by Kira Hall) is the young daughter of Pa and Ma Gorg who was born in the Fraggle Rock: Back to the Rock special "The First Snow of Fraggle Rock". Karen Prell helped perform Princess Gorg by operating the eyes.

The Gorgs were developed by art director Douglas Cook in the Isle of Wight. In one of the final episodes, all leaves suddenly drop from The Nirvana Tree in the Gorg's Garden, which is the traditional sign that the reigning King must abdicate his throne and allow the crown prince to succeed. But after eating the last Nirvana leaf, Junior shrinks to Fraggle size, sees the realm from their point of view (including a consultation with Marjory the Trash Heap), and upon returning to his Gorg stature, invites his Fraggle friends to his coronation. As King, his first act is to abolish the Gorg monarchy, introducing a Fraggle-like society where all creatures are socially equal.

In design, the Gorgs are similar to Big Bird, but are operated in a more technologically advanced manner by two puppeteers: Rob Mills, for example, performed inside the body of the Junior Gorg puppet, thus allowing Junior to use both hands. The puppet's head was separate from the body, and on-set, Richard Hunt would insert his hand into a waldo to move Junior's mouth (and provide his voice) while using a device to control his eyes. The masks for the Gorgs have their own TV monitors in them so that the Gorg performers can see where they are going.

== Marjory the Trash Heap ==
Marjory the Trash Heap

Marjory the Trash Heap (performed by Jerry Nelson in the original series, Aymee Garcia in Fraggle Rock: Back to the Rock, voiced by Rob Paulsen in the animated series) is a wise being (referred to as an "oracle") that serves as the garbage dump of the Gorgs. She and her heckling heralds live near the Gorg's garden, and she gives the Fraggles guidance and advice, which the Fraggles regard with reverence, although they do not worship her. She also appears to have some magical abilities (specifically telepathy and the ability to teleport items or Fraggles), although she does not often use them. Sometimes she knits to pass the time. She has an uncle named Maximillian (which was somehow spelled with a "silent Q"), whom she refers to as "Uncle Max". In the animated series, Marjory speaks in a Jewish/Yiddish accent. Although being made of the Gorgs's junk, and having no real need for clothing, Philo and Gunge occasionally lavish her with jewelry (headbands and bracelets made of random objects), and often looks at her Fraggle clientele through a pair of spectacles mounted on a stick.

In the German version of the serial, Marjory is given the moniker Allwissende Müllhalde (engl. all-knowing Trash Heap).

She was designed by Michael K. Frith and built by Jane Gootnick and Maria McNamara.

=== Philo and Gunge ===
Philo and Gunge (performed by Dave Goelz and Richard Hunt in the original series, Dan Garza and John Tartaglia in Fraggle Rock: Back to the Rock and voiced by John Stephenson and Bob Bergen in the animated series) are the heralds of the Trash Heap. They often introduce her as the "all-knowing, all-seeing Trash Heap! Nyeah!" They supply humor, bad jokes, and puns. Although Gunge portrays himself as the brains of the pair, neither ever really prove a great help. They watch over the Trash Heap; if they were to leave for a long time, she would begin to die out. When she finishes speaking, they announce, "The Trash Heap has spoken! Nyeah!" Philo and Gunge had two episodes of the series devoted to them: "Home Is Where the Trash Is" and "Gunge the Great & Glorious".

They were designed by Michael K. Frith and built by Jane Gootnick.

== The Silly Creatures of Outer Space ==
The producers made the series with the intention of it airing in various forms internationally. Therefore, some characters and "Outer Space" locations were changed. (While the original North American and German versions were set in a workshop, the UK episodes were set in a lighthouse, while the French episodes were set in a bakery)

Gobo's Uncle Traveling Matt has gone to explore the human world (Fraggles call it Outer Space), and he regularly sends postcards back to Gobo. The name "Traveling Matt" puns on the film special-effects device known as a traveling matte. Matt calls the humans he meets the "Silly Creatures." Yet despite his contempt, the interactions related in his postcards often show his own ignorance. For example, he once sees two teenage girls chewing bubble gum: when they blow bubbles, he believes that the "food" has made their tongues inflate and explode.

- Doc (portrayed by Gerard Parkes in the original series and voiced by John Stephenson in the animated series) is an inventor in the original North American version of the show and a former barber. His workshop has a Fraggle Hole that leads into Fraggle Rock. Gobo must go out into Doc's workshop to retrieve the postcards from the wastebasket where Doc throws them. Doc remains unaware of the Fraggles' existence. In the second-to-last episode, he finally learns that the Fraggles exist and befriends them. Matt also returns home to Fraggle Rock. When Ned Shimmelfinney moves to the desert due to his health, Doc moves with him. Due to the wisdom of Marjory the Trash Heap where states "You cannot leave the magic", a magical portal opened up in Fraggle Rock that enabled Gobo and his friends to go to where Doc is currently living. In the animated series, Doc's head isn't shown. In the original series's finale, the theme song is played one as the credits roll, and Doc delivers the last line of "Down in Fraggle Rock!", punctuated by a bark from Sprocket.
- Doctor Doc (portrayed by Lilli Cooper) is a female who is exclusive to Fraggle Rock: Back to the Rock. She is the owner of Sprocket and a graduate student working towards her doctorate in marine biology.
- Sprocket (performed by Steve Whitmire in the original live-action series, John Tartaglia in Fraggle Rock: Back to the Rock, voiced by Rob Paulsen in the animated series) is Doc's dog. He has seen the Fraggles and tries in vain to prove their existence to his owner. On a few occasions, he has actually ventured into Fraggle Rock and encountered the Fraggles, Doozers and Gorgs and is capable of saying Gobo's name. As a live-hand Muppet, which requires two performers, Steve Whitmire was assisted in performing him by Karen Prell who handles Sprocket's right hand and wagging tail. He was designed by Michael K. Frith and built by Tim Miller.
- International Docs – There were different adaptations for Docs in different countries that aired Fraggle Rock where each one had their equivalents of Doc and Sprocket:
  - UK Version – In the UK version, the Doc role was changed to the Captain (portrayed by Fulton Mackay). He is a retired sailor living in a rocky-sea lighthouse (which was portrayed by the St. Anthony's Lighthouse located near Falmouth, Cornwall) with his version of Sprocket.
    - P.K. (portrayed by John Gordon Sinclair) is the Captain's nephew who appeared in Season 4 following the death of Fulton Mackay.
    - B.J. (portrayed by Simon O'Brien) is the son of the lighthouse owner, Mr. Bertwhistle, who appeared in Season 6. In the penultimate episode, B.J. finally learns that the Fraggles exist and befriends Gobo. Due to the lighthouse being automated with technology, B.J. and Sprocket had to move away. B.J. takes up a job as a property caretaker at a castle which is where he and Sprocket discover the second Fraggle hole. This is how Gobo and his friends were able to reunite with B.J. and Sprocket
  - German Version – The German version of Doc (played by Hans Helmut Dickow) is similar to the US version of Doc.
  - French Version – The French version of Doc (played by Michel Robin) who worked as a baker and a French alter-ego for Sprocket called Croquette. Doc inherited the home from his eccentric Uncle Georges (who was a noted inventor). Thus, when the frame story required the use of a mechanical device, Doc would merely find yet another of Uncle Georges' machines. Plotlines also frequently involved the elegant but unseen Madame Pontaven (who Doc repeatedly attempted to impress and invite to dinner with no success).

There were some other characters that Doc had interacted with off-screen or on the telephone:

- Doc has a friend named Ned Shimmelfinney who lives next door to him. At first, Sprocket hates Shimmelfinney, who owns a cat named Fluffanella (voiced by Karen Prell in the original series, Ingrid Hansen in Fraggle Rock: Back to the Rock). Sprocket makes a face and choking gestures every time Shimmelfinney's name is mentioned. He stops doing this after Doc and Shimmelfinney have a fight in "The Great Radish Famine". In the last episode, Ned Shimmelfinney moves to the desert for his health causing Doc and Sprocket to go with him. In Fraggle Rock: Back to the Rock, Doctor Doc is neighbors with a Mrs. Shimmelfinney who is Doctor Doc's landlady.
- Doc also helps out Ms. Betty Ardath who moves into his neighborhood in "A Cave of One's Own." She runs a bed-and-breakfast called "The Captain's Inn". Sprocket has a crush on her pet Airedale Terrier named Marigold just as Doc has a secret crush on Betty.

== Other characters ==
- Aretha (performed by Sharon Lee Williams) - A cave creature that accompanies Gobo when he sings "Only Way Home" in the episode "Sir Hubris and the Gorgs." The puppet for Aretha appears as an assortment of characters in The Muppet Christmas Carol, Muppet Time (with horns this time and named Huffy), Muppet Treasure Island, the Muppets Tonight promo for BBC, Mopatop's Shop and The Muppets' Wizard of Oz.
- The Avalanche Monster (performed by Bob Stutt) - A monstrous rock creature. This creature has very poor eyesight but quite acute hearing and lives in Avalanche Pass on the Wonder Trail of Wonder Mountain.
- Balsam the Minstrel (performed by Ali Eisner in Fraggle Rock: Back to the Rock) - An unidentified insect-like creature that is one of the five Minstrels. Balsam plays the bongo drums. In Fraggle Rock: Back to the Rock, Balsam is a member of the Troubadours. He was designed by Michael K. Frith and built by Rollie Krewson.
- Beastie (performed by Karen Prell) - Tosh Fraggle's pet beast that resembles a lion. Beastie appears in some episodes of Mopatop's Shop.
- The Beast of Bluerock - The Beast of Bluerock lives in a mysterious lair that is only visible for the two days after the Doozer equinox, and then unseen for another year. It is later proven to be the fear in the Fraggles's hearts as part of a test by Marjory the Trash Heap.
- Begoony (performed by John Pattison) - A magical rabbit-like creature that Mokey befriends in "The Incredible Shrinking Mokey". He had been abandoned by others before and tried to keep Mokey from abandoning him by shrinking her and trapping her in a small house. The puppet for Begoony appears in The Muppet Christmas Carol, Muppet Treasure Island, Muppets Tonight and Mopatop's Shop.
- Blue Dragon (performed by Rob Mills) - A creature that Red encounters in one of the worlds beyond the magical arches of the T. Matthew Fraggle Room in "Red's Blue Dragon."
- The Blustering Bellowpane Monster (performed by Tom Vandenberg) - A creature which blows Boober's lucky hat off his head in "You Can't Do That Without a Hat". The puppet for Blustering Bellowpane Monster appears in Inner Tube, Muppets Tonight, Mopatop's Shop, The Muppets, and Muppets Most Wanted
- Bongo (performed by Aymee Garcia) - A magical rabbit-like creature that Boober once found eating food out of his pantry. He is a recycled version of Begoony.
- Brool the Minstrel (performed by Tim Gosley in the original series, Aymee Garcia in Fraggle Rock: Back to the Rock) - An unspecified creature who is one of the five Minstrels. He plays a string instrument that looks like a large guitar. The puppet for Brool the Minstrel appears in The Muppet Christmas Carol, Muppet Treasure Island, Muppets Tonight and Mopatop's Shop.
- Clinging Creepers - A group of killer weeds that can spread quickly. They are stoppable only by flowers. Bouquet brigades are formed in order to hang flowers throughout the rock to repel the creepers.
- Coop (voiced by Ali J. Eisner) - A Flooby Bug that appears in the Fraggle Rock: Back to the Rock episode "Night of the Lights".
- Cooties - A race of creatures whose sting causes Rock Fever.
- Ditzies (both voiced by Kathryn Mullen) - A race of tiny creatures that give off light. They live off music and are the source of all light in Fraggle Rock as seen in "The Day the Music Died". In the event that there is a lack of music, the entire rock gets dark causing the Fraggles, Doozers, and any other life in the rock to fall asleep.
- The Dreedlebugs - The Dreedlebugs build nests which are good for making ink.
- Enigma Fish
- Flutebird (performed by Kathryn Mullen) - A bird with a flute-like beak.
- Flying Batworm (performed by Steve Whitmire) - A nocturnal dragon-like species that is hard to spot because it only comes out at night. In "New Trash Heap in Town", Mokey manages to successfully paint a portrait of the Flying Batworm.
- Food - A strange, brown creature that makes his appearance many times in Fraggle Rock. It is a recycled version of the puppet of the same name from The Land of Gorch.
- Furious Garboil (voiced by Bob Bergen) - It debuted in the episode "The Great Fraggle Freeze". It is a creature that resides at the end of the Mystical Magical Maze. The Furious Garboil is described by an ancient Fraggle explorer as a terrible creature that would bite one's head off, stomp his victims, kick them into a bottomless pit, and then insult them. It turned out that the Furious Garboil is actually a small, nasal-voiced individual who merely wants some privacy and to prevent uninvited guests.
- The Gaga Bugs - They have a bite that causes insanity.
- Giant Bolo Monster
- Giant Slurp - A cave creature that debuted in the episode "No Fraggle is an Island".
- The Glob (performed by Rob Mills) - A giant rolling blob of generally amorphous shape, nevertheless has some kind of mouth somewhere. In "Boober and the Glob", the Glob comes in and eats Doozer after Doozer. The Fraggles finally find a way to get the Glob to regurgitate all the Doozers by telling jokes and getting the thing to laugh very intensely.
- The Great Glitterini (performed by Ben Durocher, voiced by Adam Lambert) - A magical genderqueer creature who appears in the Fraggle Rock: Back to the Rock episode "I'm Pogey". She was built by Rollie Krewson
- Gluey Rudey (performed by Frank Meschkuleit) - Gluey Rudey is a small parasite that appears in the Fraggle Rock: Back to the Rock episode "The Twisty-Turny-Thon".
- Gridgen Spiders
- The Honkfish - The Honkfish inhabit the river near the Gorgs' Castle. They swim around a bend and get stuck once a year.
- The Inkspots (both performed by Trish Leeper, Rob Mills, and Gord Robertson) - Little creatures with bulging eyes who appear in the background of various episodes. The puppets for the Inkspots appears in The Jim Henson Hour episode "Power", the "Kokomo" Music Video from Muppet Beach Party, The Muppet Christmas Carol, Muppet Treasure Island, Muppets Tonight and Mopatop's Shop.
  - Joogie (performed by Ali J. Eisner) is an Inkspot that was named in the Fraggle Rock: Back to the Rock episode "The Glow".
- The Invisible Garboil - A fearsome evil ancient horrible monster of Fraggle lore that lives in the Great Outer Maze. No-one knows its size or shape due to its invisibility. Gobo accidentally releases it, but tricks it back into its rocky tomb.
- Lanford (performed by Rob Mills in the original series, Ingrid Hansen in Fraggle Rock: Back to the Rock) - Mokey's pet plant called a Night-Blooming Yellow-Leaved Deathwort. Though they have moments of reconciliation, for the most part Lanford and Red do not get along.
- The Last of the Lilly Creatures (performed by Bob Stutt) - A purple sea monster. Red discovered it in the episode "Red's Sea Monster."
- Little Rago (performed by Ingrid Hansen) - Little Rago is a cave creature that appears in the Fraggle Rock: Back to the Rock episode "Mezzo: Live in Concert" and "Letting Go". He was a recycled version of a background cave creature from the original series and was previously used as "Bossy Boots" in Mopatop's Shop.
- The Magical Spider-Fly (performed by Richard Hunt) - A flying insect that can turn into an avuncular Fraggle-like being and grant wishes. He was referred to as the "Odd Old Man" in the Encyclopedia Fragglia.
- The Mama Tree Creature (performed by Kathryn Mullen) - A kind of Gorg bird.
  - The Papa Tree Creature (performed by Steve Whitmire) is a kind of Gorg bird.
  - The Baby Tree Creature (performed by Karen Prell) - A type of Gorg bird that is seen in "Wembley's Egg". Its egg was accidentally dropped down into the well by Junior Gorg, and hatched by Wembley. The tree creature believed Wembley was its mother, and was eventually reunited with its real parents. The puppet for Baby Tree Creature appears in The Ghost of Faffner Hall episode "The Voice is an Instrument" and "Music Brings Us Together".
- Manford - Manford is a carnivorous mushroom residing in Lost Fraggle Rock who appears in Fraggle Rock: Back to the Rock and a counterpart of Lanford.
- Mantivore (performed by Frank Meschkuleit) - A large mantis-like creature that resides in a spout by Craggle Lagoon. While the Craggles thought he was vicious, Red and Lyle find out he is actually genial. The Mantivore's puppet was built by James Kroupa.
- Mavis (performed by Sandra Shamas) - A magical mirror which Red and Cotterpin encounter in "Mirror, Mirror".
- The Mean Genie (performed by Richard Hunt) - A genie who is found by Wembley in "Wembley and the Mean Genie". He is a rude and selfish bully who exhibits bad behaviors such as painting graffiti, breaking things, and drinking radish beer.
- The Merggles - The Merggles appear in "Beyond the Pond" when roots are taking over the pond and Red tries to kill them, yet when she touches the roots she receives the message "follow the roots" and indeed does follow the roots to find a new land inhabited by Merggles who are like Fraggles but have fish tails instead of legs indicating that the Merggles are the Fraggle Rock version of the Merpeople. The Merggles have also appeared in Fraggle Rock: Back to the Rock.
  - The Merggle Queen (performed by Karen Prell, voiced by Patti LaBelle) - The ruler of the Merggles who is exclusive to Fraggle Rock: Back to the Rock.
  - Ferguson Merggle (performed by Kanja Chen) - A Merggle who is exclusive to Fraggle Rock: Back to the Rock.
  - Melody Merggle (performed by Kira Hall) - A Merggle who is exclusive to Fraggle Rock: Back to the Rock.
  - Merboo Merggle (performed by Kathryn Mullen) - A Merggle prophet.
  - Merkey Merggle (performed by Rob Mills) - The Merggle prophet of the dark side.
  - Mermer Merggle (performed by Steve Whitmire) - The leader of the Merggles.
  - Merple Merggle (performed by Nikki Tilroe) - A Merggle who is always happy and also the prophet of the bright side.
  - Mervin Merggle (performed by Jerry Nelson) - A Merggle who sells hats.
- Mezzo (performed by Donna Kimball, voiced by Ariana DeBose) - An unspecified creature and a known celebrity that is exclusive to Fraggle Rock: Back to the Rock. While parts of her resembles a Fraggle, she sports insect wings and long limbs. She and her band are known to perform at Concert Cave as every creature there is a fan of hers. To help Donna Kimball pull off some of Mezzo's movements, Kira Hall performed both of Mezzo's legs, Aymee Garcia performed Mezzo's right arm, Ingrid Hansen performs Mezzo's left arm, and Jason Ward performed Mezzo's wings
  - Dusty - A member of Mezzo's band.
  - Monchis (performed by Dan Garza) - The drummer of Mezzo's band.
  - Twelve Toes - A member of Mezzo's band.
- Mirkmonster (performed by Bob Stutt) - An enormous creature that appears only as an arm and longer than a handful of Fraggles. It appears in "A Cave of One's Own".
- Moss-billed Flubberducks
- Mudwell the Mudbunny (performed by Richard Hunt) - A creature whom Wembley meets and has a very short life-span. He dies leaving Wembley to learn about life's greatest mystery. It is revealed that when a Mudbunny dies, it is reborn as a Lizard (performed by Rob Mills) with faint memories of its past life. The puppet for Mudwell the Mudbunny appears in The Muppet Christmas Carol, Holiday Greetings from The Ed Sullivan Show, Muppet Time (as Wally), Muppet Treasure Island, Muppet Sing Alongs: Muppet Treasure Island, and Mopatop's Shop. Mudwell's Lizard form was later recycled in Fraggle Rock: Back to the Rock as Grizzard (performed by Kanja Chen).
- Murray the Minstrel (performed by Steve Whitmire in most episodes, Gord Robertson in "The Honk of Honks" and Jordan Lockhart in Fraggle Rock: Back to the Rock) - An unspecified creature who is one of the five Minstrels and "second-in-command" to Cantus, plays a guitar. In Fraggle Rock: Back to the Rock, Murray is a member of the Troubadours and plays the horn. He was designed by Michael K. Frith and built by Tim Miller. The puppet for Murray the Minstrel appears in The Muppet Christmas Carol, Holiday Greetings from The Ed Sullivan Show, Muppet Treasure Island, Muppets Tonight, and Mopatop's Shop.
- The Plants of the Cave of Boredom/Forgetfulness - The Plants in the Cave of Boredom/Forgetfulness are carnivorous plants that release a gas (or a form of pollen) that causes anyone who breathes it in to forget absolutely everything. Eventually, the victim reaches the point where they forget how to stand up and the plants move in and eat them.
- The Poison Cackler (performed by Tim Gosley) - A large, fearsome, scorpion-like creature who enjoys eating smoke bombs. One has been pursuing the Wizard because of this. In "The Trial of Cotterpin Doozer", a Baby Poison Cackler (performed by Rob Mills) was featured. Large Marvin Fraggle had to give it his food in order to save Cotterpin Doozer enough for Judge Gavel Doozer to let Cotterpin Doozer keep her job. The puppet for Poison Cackler appears in The Jim Henson Hour episode "Outer Space" as Jo Beth Garfdoohoo and "The Secrets of The Muppets" and Muppets Tonight episode 104 in its "Tales from the Vet" segment.
- Repeatee Birds (performed by Ben Durocher, Ali J. Eisner, Aymee Garcia, Dan Garza, Kira Hall, and Ingrid Hansen) - The Repeatee Birds are a species of birds that appear in their self-titled episode of Fraggle Rock: Back to the Rock.
- Rock Clingers (both performed by Lee Armstrong) - The Rock Clingers live in the Crystal Cavern. If a Rock Clinger falls in love with a Fraggle, the creature will follow that Fraggle everywhere.
- Rockbeetles
- Rumblebugs - The Rumblebugs are bugs that create humming sounds.
- Screaming Iceworms
- Singing Cacti (both voiced by Sharon Lee Williams) - The Singing Cacti have a song that mesmerizes all those who hear it. They live on the Wonder Trail that leads up to Wonder Mountain.
- Skenfrith (performed by Dave Goelz) - Skenfrith is a magical creature whose appearance and personality are altered depending on what those around him believe or imagine.
- Sneels - The Sneels found in Gunge the Great and the Glorious, are furry plant-eating critters, with glasses seen throughout the caves as Gunge makes his way to the Doozer Dome. When Philo however heads to confront him, he then bites the purple one while eating. The puppets were seussified for The Wubbulous World of Dr. Seuss where the critters live in the Jungle of Nool. The babies make their debut on the series and eventually made their first Fraggle episode on the reboot.
- Terrible Tunnel - The Terrible Tunnel may or may not be considered a stone dragon (it is unknown whether it is actually alive or not), but it is terrible. It is a long, cobweb-encrusted tunnel that leads to a large mouth-shaped boulder. If the boulder is touched, it snaps open like a set of jaws and pulls any unfortunate creature into it with a powerful vacuum. According to the Storyteller, Sir Blunderbrain sacrificed himself to save his party of explorers from the tunnel. In its self-titled episode, Wembley, Gobo, and Red barely escape from it. So far, they are the only ones who have.
- Thimblebeetles – The Thimblebeetles otherwise known as "Thimblebugs". They are considered pets of the Fraggles. Gobo does mention in the episode "Gone, But Not Forgotten", that he had a Thimblebug as a pet.
- Toe Ticklers - The Toe Ticklers are fuzzy caterpillar-like creatures that are despised by the Gorgs since they eat flowers. They get their name because they are known to tickle the feet of Fraggles. However, they eventually pupate and turn into Purple Sproingers, floating jellyfish-like creatures which the Gorgs admire as beautiful creatures of the skies (much in the same way that humans look upon caterpillars and butterflies).
- Toadies - The Toadies are tailed frog-like critters that pop up from the rocks to harass Uncle Matt for his toupee he dropped in "Inspector Red".
- Wander McMooch (performed by Bob Stutt) - Wander McMooch is a terrible warty toad-like creature who lives in some form of swamp or bog. He first appears in "Junior Sells the Farm" where he tries to swindle the Gorgs out of their homestead. He seems to have some prior experience with Fraggles because he hates them. He is revealed to be an old nemesis of Marjory the Trash Heap and enslaves Philo and Gunge when they leave home for greener pastures in "Home is Where the Trash is". When the Fraggles discover this predicament (Marjory is sure they are in trouble but unclear in what way), the Fraggles track Wander McMooch to his home in the swamp where Philo and Gunge start to do acts of cuteness enough for Wander McMooch to let them go. He was designed by Michael K. Frith. The puppet for Wander McMooch appears in The Muppet Christmas Carol, Muppet Treasure Island, and the Mopatop's Shop episode "Rude Dude".
