= Gobo Fraggle =

Muppet character

- Fraggle Rock character
- Gobo in a publicity shot
- Created by: Jim Henson
- Voiced by: Townsend Coleman (Fraggle Rock: The Animated Series)
- Performed by: Jerry Nelson (1983–1993); John Tartaglia (2013–present)

In-universe information
- Species: Fraggle
- Gender: Male
- Occupation: Explorer

Gobo Fraggle is a fictional puppet character from the television series Fraggle Rock, created by Jim Henson. He is performed by Jerry Nelson in the original series, and by John Tartaglia in its 2022 reboot Fraggle Rock: Back to the Rock. In both iterations of the program, Gobo is one of the five main characters (alongside Red, Wembley, Mokey, and Boober), and the protagonist overall.

Gobo is an explorer, and the leader of the main group of five Fraggles who star in the show. He is adventurous and clever, though he has a tendency to act conceited on occasion. He is the nephew of Uncle Traveling Matt, another explorer, who left Fraggle Rock at the beginning of the show to explore "Outer Space", aka the human world. Uncle Traveling Matt regularly sends postcards to Gobo, who must journey into the house of Doc (the show's main human character) to retrieve them.

== Development ==
The first prototype Gobo puppet was built by Caroly Wilcox in 1981. Jim Henson can be seen performing this puppet in a Toronto press conference in December 1981. Longtime Muppet performer Jerry Nelson was cast to play the character. A rebuilt Gobo puppet was used during the filming of some of the earliest taped material for the series. Jerry Nelson was not a fan of this puppet, disliking its long, beak-like mouth. A revised version of the puppet with a rounder mouth was used in the first 12 episodes of the series. This puppet wore a yellow sweater under a purple cardigan. During a brief production break halfway through the first season, Gobo was redesigned, along with another character from the series, Ma Gorg. This version has shorter hair, visible eyelids, and now wore a brown vest. This design has been used for Gobo ever since.

Gobo's name is a reference to a gobo, short for "go between", a lighting term used in film, television, and theater.

== Appearances ==
Following the conclusion of Fraggle Rock in 1987, Gobo would go on to appear in Fraggle Rock: The Animated Series, voiced here by Townsend Coleman. He would also appear in the 1987 Christmas special A Muppet Family Christmas along with the other Fraggles, again performed by Nelson. He would reappear in a starring role in 2022 in Fraggle Rock's reboot, Fraggle Rock: Back to the Rock.

== Behind the scenes ==
Gobo is a rod puppet, which means that his arms are controlled by rods attached to the puppet's hands.

Following Jerry Nelson's death in 2012, puppeteer John Tartaglia took over the role of Gobo beginning in 2013. Gobo first reappeared in TV commercials for The Hub's "Fraggle Rock-a-Thon" to celebrate the show's 30th anniversary. Tartaglia would go on to perform him in the 2020 short-form revival series Fraggle Rock: Rock On for Apple TV+, and subsequently in Back to the Rock. Tartaglia also serves as an executive producer for the show.
