= Red Fraggle =

Muppet character

- Fraggle Rock character
- Red in a publicity shot
- Created by: Jim Henson
- Voiced by: Barbara Goodson (Fraggle Rock: The Animated Series)
- Performed by: Karen Prell (1983–present)

In-universe information
- Species: Fraggle
- Gender: Female
- Occupation: Swimmer

Red Fraggle is a fictional character in Jim Henson's television series Fraggle Rock, as well as its reboot Fraggle Rock: Back to the Rock. She is one of the five main characters from the series, alongside Gobo, Wembley, Mokey, and Boober. She was performed and voiced by Karen Prell in both the original series and its reboot. Barbara Goodson voiced her in the animated series.

Red is the best friend and roommate of Mokey Fraggle. She is adventurous, fun-loving, cheerful, and athletic. She is a fan of sports and loves to swim in the Fraggle pool. She can be highly competitive with her friends, and has something of a rivalry with her friend Gobo, as well as strongly disliking Gobo's uncle Traveling Matt. She also dislikes Mokey's pet plant Lanford, though she warms up to him later.

Red has proved to be one of the most popular characters from Fraggle Rock. Karen Prell has made live appearances with Red at various events. Red returned, performed once again by Prell, in the short-form Apple TV+ series Fraggle Rock: Rock On and the reboot series.

== Development ==
Red, along with the other Fraggles, was conceived and developed by series creator Jim Henson. The Red puppet was designed by Michael K. Frith and built by Rollie Krewson. Red's name is a reference to a "redhead", another name for an 800w film light.

== Appearances ==
Red appears as one of the five main characters from the original Fraggle Rock series and its reboot Fraggle Rock: Back to the Rock. She also appears in the short Apple TV+ series Fraggle Rock: Rock On!. She is also seen, along with the other Fraggles, in the 1987 TV special A Muppet Family Christmas. In between the original series and its reboot, Red made several live appearance at conventions, and she also appeared in promos for The Hub's "Fraggle Rock-a-Thon" in 2013.

== Behind the scenes ==
Red is a rod puppet, which means that her arms are controlled by rods attached to the puppet's hands.

During the audition process for the original series, Kathryn Mullen auditioned to play Red, but she was instead cast to play Mokey. Karen Prell was cast as Red, and has portrayed her ever since. Prell returned to play Red on Back to the Rock, where she was also attached as an executive producer.
