= Boober Fraggle =

Muppet character

- Fraggle Rock character
- Boober in a publicity shot
- Created by: Jim Henson
- Voiced by: Rob Paulsen (Fraggle Rock: The Animated Series)
- Performed by: Dave Goelz (1983–present)

In-universe information
- Alias: Sidebottom
- Species: Fraggle
- Gender: Male
- Occupation: Laundry cleaner; cook

Boober Fraggle is a fictional puppet character from the television series Fraggle Rock. He was created by Jim Henson. He is performed and voiced by Dave Goelz in both the original series and its 2022 reboot Fraggle Rock: Back to the Rock, with Frank Meschkuleit providing the puppetry in the latter. In the animated series, he was voiced by Rob Paulsen. In both iterations of the show, Boober is one of the five main characters, alongside Gobo, Wembley, Mokey, and Red.

Boober is a misanthropic, depressed, and superstitious Fraggle. He lives alone in a small cave, and spends much of his time worrying about death and disease. His occupation is doing laundry for all the Fraggles in Fraggle Rock, and he also enjoys cooking, particularly with radishes. He has an alter ego named Sidebottom, who represents the more extroverted side of Boober's personality. In Back to the Rock, it is revealed that Boober's baloobius (the tip of his tail) glows when he feels most at ease with himself, something that happens to other Fraggles as well.

== Development ==
Boober Fraggle was designed by Michael K. Frith, and built by Leslee Asch. Allegedly, his name came from an angry cow encountered by one of Jim Henson's daughters in Devon. According to an interview included in the Fraggle Rock: The Complete First Season DVD box set, Jerry Nelson originally wanted to play Boober, but Henson instead wanted Nelson to play Gobo, a role he would end up taking. The role of Boober went to Dave Goelz, who has played him ever since. Boober stemmed from something Goelz had said while working on the first season of The Muppet Show, that he was so busy on the show that the only things he had time to worry about were death and laundry.

== Behind the scenes ==
Boober is a rod puppet, meaning that his arms are controlled by rods attached to the puppet's hands, which the puppeteer controls with his left hand while moving the puppet's mouth with his right.

For the 2020 short-form series Fraggle Rock: Rock On! on Apple TV+, Goelz reprised his role of Boober vocally, as well as his other role of Uncle Traveling Matt, while Boober was physically performed by John Tartaglia. On the ongoing reboot series Fraggle Rock: Back to the Rock, Boober is performed by Frank Meschkuleit (who also voices Pa Gorg on the new series), with Goelz providing the voice.
