= Margaret Nichols (animator) =

American animator and television director

Margaret Nichols (c. 1930 – November 5, 2012) was an American animator and television director. Professionally, she was also known as Margaret Flores Nichols and Margaret Grewell.

She directed several animated television series, including The Transformers from 1985–86; four series in 1986 - The Glo Friends, MoonDreamers, Inhumanoids and Potato Head Kids; My Little Pony 'n Friends from 1986 to 1987; and the Fraggle Rock animated series in 1987.

Nichols was employed between 1955 until 1993 by such studios as Warner Bros., Walt Disney Animation Studios, UPA, Fleischer Studios, Snowball Animation, Ray Patin, TV Spots, Creston, Eagle, Hanna-Barbera, Marvel Productions, Universal Studios and Graz Entertainment. She served on the executive board of The Animation Guild, I.A.T.S.E. Local 839 (1980–85).

== Career ==
While Nichols had worked in animation since 1955, she received her first professional credit for her work as layout artist for the 1970 primetime television movie, Uncle Sam Magoo, an arm of the Mr. Magoo cartoon. She soon worked as on the 1971 film, Shinbone Alley, as a layout and background artist.

=== 1970s ===
Nichols worked extensively as animator for television series and specials during the 1970s. She was an assistant animator for the 1973 Hanna-Barbera theatrical release, Charlotte's Web, based on the children's book of the same name by E. B. White. Her credits as animator for television films, shorts and specials included Great Escape in 1974, The White Seal in 1975, and A Flintstone Christmas in 1977.

Her 1970s television series production credits, many for Hanna-Barbera, included The Pebbles and Bamm-Bamm Show in 1971; The Flintstone Comedy Hour in 1972; Speed Buggy in 1973; These Are the Days in 1974; Partridge Family 2200 A.D. in 1974; the ABC Afterschool Special, Cyrano, in 1974; The Tom and Jerry Show in 1975; The Mumbly Cartoon Show in 1976; The Scooby-Doo/Dynomutt, Dog Wonder Hour in 1976; CB Bears in 1977; The All-New Super Friends Hour in 1977; Scooby's All-Star Laff-A-Lympics in 1977; three 1978 series - Jana of the Jungle, Dynomutt, Dog Wonder and Challenge of the Superfriends; the Godzilla animated series from 1978 to 1979; Scooby-Doo and Scrappy-Doo in 1979; The World's Greatest Super Friends in 1979; and Casper and the Angels in 1979.

=== 1980s ===
Nichols expanded to become a director and animation director during the 1980s. She served as the animation director for two 1986 theatrical films, My Little Pony: The Movie and The Transformers: The Movie, as well as the direct-to-video G.I. Joe: The Movie, released in 1987. She was also a character animator for the 1982 theatrical musical, Heidi's Song, and an animator for the 1987 animated feature film, Rock Odyssey.

Nichols also became the animation director for several television series, including Jim Henson's Muppet Babies from 1985 to 1988 and Defenders of the Earth in 1986. She similarly held the positions of animation director during the production of the television movies Solarman in 1986 and X-Men: Pryde of the X-Men in 1989.

Nichols began work for Walt Disney Animation Studios during the mid and late 1980s. She held the post of a clean-up animator for Disney's 1985 film, The Black Cauldron. She then served as an assistant animator for Who Framed Roger Rabbit by Touchstone Pictures and Disney's Oliver & Company, both released in 1988. Nichols later became a key character animator on Disney's The Little Mermaid, released in 1989, and The Rescuers Down Under, released in 1990.

In addition to her work as an animation director, Nichols became a sequence director for the 1985 television movie, The Glo Friends Save Christmas, and Bigfoot and the Muscle Machines. She also directed the sequences for Robotix in 1985; G.I. Joe: A Real American Hero from 1985 to 1986; The Transformers from 1986 to 1987 (which she also directed); and The Little Wizards in 1987.

Her additional animation credits during the 1980s Tex Avery's The Kwicky Koala Show in 1981; Trollkins in 1981; The Smurfs from 1981 to 1984; Shirt Tales in 1982; Pac-Man in 1982; Jokebook in 1982; The Charlie Brown and Snoopy Show in 1983; and The New Scooby and Scrappy-Doo Show.

=== 1990s ===
Nichols became the animation director of I Yabba-Dabba Do!, a television movie based on The Flintstones. She became the animation director for the television series Bobby's World in 1990 through 1998; Bucky O'Hare and the Toad Wars in 1991; Space Cats in 1991; The Addams Family in 1992; Tom & Jerry Kids in 1992; The Pirates of Dark Water from 1992 to 1993; and Droopy, Master Detective in 1993.

Nichols worked as both a timing director and sheet timer for Saban Entertainment's X-Men from 1992 until 1994 as well as the timing director for The Tick in 1994.

Nichols retired in the mid-1990s. She died on November 5, 2012, aged 82.
