= Mokey Fraggle =

Muppet character

- Fraggle Rock character
- Mokey in a publicity shot with her design from the original series
- Created by: Jim Henson
- Voiced by: Mona Marshall (Fraggle Rock: The Animated Series)
- Performed by: Kathryn Mullen (1983–2013); Donna Kimball (2016–present)

In-universe information
- Species: Fraggle
- Gender: Female
- Occupation: Painter; poet; artist

Mokey Fraggle is a fictional puppet character created by Jim Henson. She is one of the five main characters in Henson's television series Fraggle Rock, as well as its 2022 reboot Fraggle Rock: Back to the Rock. She is performed by Kathryn Mullen in the original series, and by Donna Kimball in Back to the Rock. Mona Marshall voiced her in the animated series.

Mokey is one of the main characters in Fraggle Rock, alongside Gobo, Wembley, Boober, and Red. She is the best friend and roommate of Red Fraggle. Mokey is dreamy and artistic. She loves writing poems, singing songs, and painting. She has a pet plant named Lanford, who is strongly disliked by Red. Mokey is the tallest of the Fraggles. It is her job to journey into the Gorgs' garden to retrieve radishes, the Fraggles' primary source of food.

== Development ==
Mokey was designed by Michael K. Frith and built by Jan Rosenthal. She was allegedly named after a childhood friend of Jim Henson. Kathryn Mullen was cast to play the character. During rehearsals, Mokey was originally performed by Karen Prell, who would later play Red.

== Behind the scenes ==
Mokey is a live-hand puppet, which means that her arms are glove-like sleeves into which the puppeteer places their real arms to move the puppet's hands. Mokey was the only character on Fraggle Rock to be a live-hand puppet, while the others were rod puppets. (Other notable live-hand puppets include Sesame Street's Ernie and The Muppets' Fozzie Bear and Rowlf). Kathryn Mullen performed Mokey's left hand, while her right hand was performed by Trish Leeper (also the on-set performer for Ma Gorg).

One of Mokey's unique features is her eyelids, which she can lift up to show surprise or other emotions. She was one of only a few puppets on the show to have this ability (the rebuilt Gobo Fraggle puppet being another).

== Reboot ==
Mokey as she appears in Fraggle Rock: Back to the Rock; her costume and hair were heavily altered from the original series.

Mokey's portrayal in the 2022 reboot TV series Fraggle Rock: Back to the Rock is significantly different from her portrayal in the original series. The Mokey puppet was redesigned heavily, now wearing a green dress instead of her gray robe, and sporting a blue beehive-like ponytail. Her eyelids are also less prominent, and she is now strictly a rod puppet, like the other characters. This version of Mokey was performed by Donna Kimball, who had previously portrayed her in the short-form TV series Fraggle Rock: Rock On! for Apple TV+. John Tartaglia (the performer for Gobo on the new series) commented on the design change during a Fraggle Rock Q&A on his Instagram stories, stating, "Mokey is super creative and artistic and she wanted a new look - she's always in touch with the creative vibes of the Rock!" Tartaglia went into more detail about the reasons for the redesign in an interview with MegaPodTastic.
