= Patrick Pinney =

American actor

- Born: Patrick Pinney; San Francisco, California, U.S.
- Education: University of the Pacific
- Occupation: Actor
- Years active: 1979–present
- Agent: William Morris Agency

Patrick Pinney is an American actor.

== Early life, family and education ==
He attended college at University of the Pacific in Stockton, California, where producer and director Dennis Jones was a classmate and roommate of his. Pinney's friends included assistant director Michele Panelli Venetis and San Francisco Bay area costumer Alison Barnwell Morris, with whom he costarred in The Deputy at the school's Rotunda Theatre.

== Career ==
Pinney has performed in theaters in the United States and in Europe. After relocating to Los Angeles, he played three characters in a play. Afterwards he was approached by a producer who offered him a role in a Hanna-Barbera animation. From there he made the transition from a serious stage actor to voice.

He has also done work on the television series Harry and the Hendersons.

=== Voice-over career ===
Pinney has provided voices for a number of animated characters, including Mighty Mouse in the short-lived Mighty Mouse: The New Adventures (1987–1988), Pa Gorg, Uncle Traveling Matt, Flange Doozer, and additional voices in the animated version of Fraggle Rock, Chico the Bouncer in the hybrid live-action/animated film Cool World (1992), the speaking voice of Painty the Pirate from the opening theme of SpongeBob SquarePants (1999–present) and Wormguy and Idikiukup in Men in Black: The Series.

He supplied the voice of the Fish Ghoulie in the Ghoulies sequel Ghoulies III: Ghoulies Go to College (1987) and voiced Stan in the video game The Curse of Monkey Island.

In the late 1980s, he worked on a number of projects. One was providing the voice for Mainframe in G.I. Joe: The Movie in 1987. He was then in X-Men in 1989. He provided the voice for Wolverine in Pryde of the X-Men which was the pilot episode for an animated series which was never produced. He had given the character an Australian sounding accent instead of the Canadian one that was expected. An article by Simone Pozzoli for the Italian language OverNewsMagazine website notices that Pinney's Australian accent interpretation of the character could be interpreted as prophetic as Australian Hugh Jackman has played the part. He has worked in the Phil Nibbelink and Simon Wells directed animation An American Tail: Fievel Goes West. From 1997 to 2001, he worked on Men in Black: The Series in episodes which include The Long Goodbye Syndrome in 1997, The Buzzard Syndrome, also in 1997 and The Big Bad Bug Syndrome in 1998.

=== Acting career (physical) ===
==== Film and television ====
Although Pinney's voiceover work is his primary career, he has appeared in some television and film roles. In 1979, he played the Captain of the Guards in the Ken Annakin-directed feature film The Fifth Musketeer which starred Beau Bridges, Sylvia Kristel and Ursula Andress. In 1983, he played a heckler in the Fantasy Island episode "God Child/Curtain Call". He appeared in The Terminator in 1984. In 2014, he played the part of Eugene Dugan in Atwill Web Series which was directed by Charles Dennis.

He also voiced characters in Disney films such as The Little Mermaid, Beauty and the Beast, Aladdin, Toy Story, The Hunchback of Notre Dame, Hercules, Mulan, Atlantis: The Lost Empire, Treasure Planet, and Brother Bear.

==== Stage ====
In June 2015, Pinney appeared at the Sierra Repertory Theatre in the play Unnecessary Farce. The play also starred Daniel Hines, Kristin Howell, Ty Smith and Nick Ferruci. The story which was set in a small town motel with an embezzling mayor with undercover police trying to catch him. Pinney played the part of a 6.4 Scottish assassin. The reviewer for the Sierra Lodestar magazine said that audiences might recognize Pinney from his part as Painty the Pirate. Pinney and director Dennis Jones have a history that goes back to 1972 when they worked together at the theatre company for Fallon House.

== Filmography ==
=== Film (animated) ===
Year	Title	Role	Note(s)	Source
1986	G.I. Joe: Arise, Serpentor, Arise!	Mainframe	Television film	
1987	G.I. Joe: The Movie	Mainframe	Direct-to-video	
1987	The Chipmunk Adventure	Additional voices	Credited as Pat Pinney	
1988	Christmas in Tattertown	Additional voices		Television film
1989	The Little Mermaid	Additional voices		
1990	DuckTales the Movie: Treasure of the Lost Lamp	Additional voices		
1991	Ghoulies III: Ghoulies Go to College	Fish Ghoulie	Direct-to-video	
1991	Beauty and the Beast	Additional voices		
1991	An American Tail: Fievel Goes West	Additional voices		
1992	Aladdin	Additional voices		
1992	Cool World	Chico (credited as Bouncer)		
1993	Look Who's Talking Now	Dog voices		
1995	Toy Story	Pizza delivery guy, angry driver #2		
1996	The Hunchback of Notre Dame	Quasimodo's father, additional voices		
1997	Hercules	Cyclops, Rock Titan's Left Head		
1998	Mulan	Fa Deng		
1998	The Wacky Adventures of Ronald McDonald: Scared Silly	Phantom head	Direct-to-video	
2001	Atlantis: The Lost Empire	Smithsonian board member #2		
2002	Lilo & Stitch	Firefighter		
2002	Treasure Planet	Aquanoggin		
2003	Brother Bear	Male bear #1		

=== Television (animated) ===
Year	Title	Role	Note(s)	Source
1987	Fraggle Rock: The Animated Series	Uncle Traveling Matt, Pa Gorg, Flange Doozer	13 episodes	
1987–88	Mighty Mouse: The New Adventures	Mighty Mouse	Main role	
1989	X-Men: Pryde of the X-Men	Wolverine	TV pilot	
1997	Cow and Chicken	Superhero #2	Ep. "Who Is Super Cow?"	
1997	Spider-Man: The Animated Series	The Thing / Ben Grimm	2 episodes	
1999	The Wild Thornberrys	MacWhirter, Radio Voice	Ep. "You Ain't Seen Nothing Yeti"	
1999–present	SpongeBob SquarePants	Painty the Pirate	Performer: "SpongeBob SquarePants Theme"	
2000	Johnny Bravo	Bailiff, Defense Attorney, Juror #1	Ep. "I Dream of Johnny/One Angry Bravo/Carnival of the Darned"	
2001	The Powerpuff Girls	Cop #1, Actor Cop, Guard #3, Male Actor, Male Teller, Crook #3	Ep. "Film Flam"	
2003	My Life as a Teenage Robot	Dismal, Soggy, Rich Guy	Ep. "Attack of the 5 1/2 Ft. Geek/Doom with a View"	
2007–present	Robot Chicken	He-Man / Prince Adam, Arnold Schwarzenegger / Terminator, Sylvester, Monterey Jack, Ted Kennedy, Dick Cheney, O. J. Simpson, Carl Fredricksen	14 episodes	
2018	Trolls: The Beat Goes On!	Nangus	Ep. "Royal Review/Funishment"	

=== Acting roles (video games) ===
Year	Title	Role	Note(s)	Source
1997	Hercules	Cyclops, Rock Titans		
1997	Curse of Monkey Island	Stan		
2002	Disney's Treasure Planet: Battle at Procyon	Tuskrus Crew, Procyon Crew		
2004	SpongeBob SquarePants: Typing	Mr. Krabs		
2010	Monkey Island 2 Special Edition: LeChuck's Revenge	Stan the Salesman, Grillcook, Moose		

=== Acting roles (theme parks) ===
Year	Title	Role	Note(s)	Source
2003	SpongeBob 4D	Painty the Pirate		

=== Acting roles (screen) ===
Film
Title	Role	Director	Year	Notes
Chicanery	Mannheim Hofflung	Charles Dennis	2014	
Atwill Web Series Episode: Judge Joanie	Eugene Dugan	Charles Dennis	2014	
Dead Men Don't Die	Announcer	Malcolm Marmorstein	1990	
The Terminator	Bar customer	James Cameron	1984	
Fantasy Island Episode "God Child / Curtain Call"	Heckler	Ted Lange	1983	
The Fifth Musketeer	Captain of the Guards	Ken Annakin	1979	

=== Acting roles (stage) ===
Film
Title	Role	Director	Venue	Date	Notes
The Golden Fleece			The Hub Theatre	August 5, 2007	Adaptation of A.R. Gurney's The Golden Fleece; co-starring with Becky Bonar
The Alchemist of Cecil Street		Charles Dennis	Radio Ranch, Sherman Oaks, California	March 31, 2009	
Tolstoy Was Never There	Brian Mayhew	Charles Dennis		2010	Cast included Kevin Dunn, Ed Begley Jr., John O'Hurley, Ron Orbach, Enn Reitel
Unnecessary Farce	Todd	Dennis Jones	Sierra Repertory Theatre	2015	
