= Fraggle Rock: Back to the Rock =

2022 television series

- Promotional poster
- Genre: Comedy; Children's television; Slapstick; Fantasy; Musical
- Based on: Characters by Jim Henson
- Developed by: Matt Fusfeld; Alex Cuthbertson
- Starring: Lilli Cooper; Puppet performers: John Tartaglia; Karen Prell; Donna Kimball; Jordan Lockhart; Frank Meschkuleit; Kevin Clash; Dan Garza; Aymee Garcia
- Voices of: Dave Goelz
- Opening theme: "Down at Fraggle Rock"
- Composer: Christopher Lennertz
- Country of origin: United States
- Original language: English
- No. of seasons: 2
- No. of episodes: 28

Production
- Executive producers: Lisa Henson; Halle Stanford; John Tartaglia; Matt Fusfeld; Alex Cuthbertson; Arnon Milchan; Yariv Milchan; Dave Goelz; Karen Prell
- Producer: Ritamarie Peruggi
- Cinematography: Gavin Smith; Asaf Benny
- Editors: Duncan Christie; Marianna Khoury; Paul Winestock
- Running time: 25–29 minutes
- Production companies: New Regency; Fusfeld & Cuthbertson Regional Entertainment; The Jim Henson Company

Original release
- Network: Apple TV+
- Release: January 21, 2022 – present

Fraggle Rock: Back to the Rock is an American children's musical fantasy comedy puppet television series. It is a reboot of Jim Henson's series Fraggle Rock (1983–1987). The first season was released on Apple TV+ on January 21, 2022, and the second season on March 29, 2024.

A holiday special entitled Night of the Lights was released on November 18, 2022. A second special entitled The First Snow of Fraggle Rock was released on December 5, 2025. A third special entitled Fraggle Rock: A Holiday Gift will be released on December 4, 2026.

The first season was released on DVD and Blu-ray on November 19, 2024, by Sony Pictures Home Entertainment.

== Synopsis ==
In a house belonging to a woman named Doc and her dog Sprocket is a hole that leads into Fraggle Rock. The Fraggles, Gobo, Mokey, Wembley, Boober, and Red live their lives within Fraggle Rock while experiencing different adventures along the way as well as interacting with Doozers and avoiding the Gorgs while harvesting radishes.

== Episodes ==
Series overview
Season	Episodes	Originally released
1	13	January 21, 2022
Christmas Special		November 18, 2022
2	13	March 29, 2024
Christmas Special		December 5, 2025
Christmas Special		December 4, 2026

=== Season 1 (2022) ===
No. overall	No. in season	Title	Directed by	Written by	Original release date
1	1	"Pilot"	Paul Fox	Matt Fusfeld & Alex Cuthbertson	January 21, 2022
Gobo Fraggle tries to prove himself a brave explorer when his Uncle Traveling Matt invites him to explore Outer Space. In outer space, Doc and Sprocket settle into their new living quarters.
2	2	"Red and the Big Jump"	J. J. Johnson	John Tartaglia	January 21, 2022
A new Doozer construction proves to be the perfect platform for Red's new diving game. But, when she tries to force Wembley to dive, he literally freezes with fear. Meanwhile, Sprocket feuds with a crab that Doc brings back from the beach.
3	3	"The Merggle Moon Migration"	J. J. Johnson	Jocelyn Stevenson	January 21, 2022
Mokey has a prophetic dream that convinces her she should trust her own intuition rather than facts, which leads her into trouble as the Fraggles make their way to witness the Merggles's one-in-a-generation migration dance. Meanwhile, Cotterpin and Architect Doozer go out looking for new sources of radishes. In outer space, Doc and Sprocket use a drone to watch baby sea turtles hatching.
4	4	"The Glow"	Paul Fox	Sabrina Jalees	January 21, 2022
Boober discovers his baloobius is able to glow and tries to hide it from his friends, just as the famed Archivist comes to check out an Outer Space artifact sent by Uncle Traveling Matt. Meanwhile, Junior Gorg also makes friends with a plant. In outer space, Doc deals with plastic litter on the beach.
5	5	"Four Wembleys and a Birthday"	J. J. Johnson	Maurin Mwombela	January 21, 2022
Wembley's friends want to celebrate his birthday with different activities. His attempts to participate in all of them end up splitting him into four individual versions of himself. Meanwhile, Cotterpin makes a gooey discovery in a strange vine. In outer space, Doc takes to the internet to bring attention to the ocean's plastic problem. Note: The episode's title is a reference to Four Weddings and a Funeral.
6	6	"The Legend of Icy Joe"	Paul Fox	Douglas Lyons	January 21, 2022
Gobo and Wembley discover the recently-unfrozen body of Icy Joe, a legendary Fraggle explorer whose temperament makes it hard to adjust to modern Fraggle society. Meanwhile, Junior Gorg continues work on the Gorg fountain. In outer space, Doc tries to stay awake while writing a paper.
7	7	"Flight of the Flutterflies"	Jordan Canning	Charley Feldman	January 21, 2022
The Troubadours come to the rock to celebrate New Day's Day. Boober becomes the unwilling centerpiece of the festivities, where he must give a holiday speech and release a new swarm of Flutterflies. In outer space, Doc prepares to propose her plastic-eating bacteria to her professors.
8	8	"Craggle Lagoon"	Jordan Canning	Maurin Mwombela	January 21, 2022
Inspired by the latest correspondence from Uncle Traveling Matt, the Fraggle Five decide to take a vacation at Craggle Lagoon. They discover that all the water has gone missing and Inspector Red helps the Craggles figure out what happened to it. Meanwhile, the Doozers try to find a way to use the mysterious pink goo Cotterpin discovered, and Junior Gorg looks for the perfect place to sun his plant. In outer space, Doc and Sprocket take a "staycation".
9	9	"The Giggle Gaggle Games (Part 1)"	Jordan Canning	Sabrina Jalees	January 21, 2022
To help the Craggles fit in, Mokey Fraggle uses her supposed knowledge of Craggles to come up with a plan: the Fraggles will play all sorts of games with the Craggles. The Craggles do not enjoy Mokey's pandering, and Mokey learns that there's far more to understanding someone then meets the eye. Near the end, Pa Gorg tells Junior to drain all of the water causing Barry Blueberry to declare (and become) a cliffhanger. In outer space, Doc tries to contact her landlady and ends up hearing a message from Cotterpin Doozer.
10	10	"Wembley the Spokesfraggle (Part 2)"	Jon Rosenbaum	Charley Feldman	January 21, 2022
The Doozers use the pink goo in their Doozer stick recipe, but the Fraggles loathe the taste and avoid eating them. In order to construct more towers, famed and persuasion expert Jack Hammer recruits Wembley to promote them. In outer space, Doc creates a robotic replica of herself to take care of Sprocket while she's at work.
11	11	"Deep Dive (Part 3)"	Jon Rosenbaum	Douglas Lyons	January 21, 2022
With the Merggles now residing in Fraggle Rock with goo-induced hiccups, Red tries to fix all the problems that have been piling up, but injures herself in the process. Gobo, Wembley, and Boober Fraggle find a way to cure the Merggles while Mokey tries to find an outlet for Red's anxiety. Meanwhile, Cotterpin continues finding a way to get rid of the goo which has now made its way to the Gorgs (with mixed reactions). In outer space, Doc tries to get Sprocket to take his medicine among other problems.
12	12	"Into the Trash (Part 4)"	Adam Stein & Zach Lipovsky	John Tartaglia	January 21, 2022
Boober feels insignificant amid the growing chaos of Fraggles, Craggles, and Merggles when all he's tasked with is making soup. He is soon recruited to help an ailing Marjory the Trash Heap by going into her trash pile to find a cure. Meanwhile, Junior Gorg is forced to give up his plant and Cotterpin finds a solution to the goo problem in Outer Space. In outer space, Doc studies her new bacteria for potentially eating microplastics. Note: The Foo Fighters make a special appearance during Uncle Traveling Matt's postcard.
13	13	"All of Us (Part 5)"	Adam Stein & Zach Lipovsky	Matt Fusfeld & Alex Cuthbertson	January 21, 2022
Gobo has a dream that inspires him to get everybody including Junior Gorg to solve the mounting problems in Fraggle Rock. In outer space, Doc puts her bacteria to the test and Uncle Traveling Matt gets trapped by Sprocket.

=== Christmas Special (2022) ===
No. overall	No. in season	Title	Directed by	Written by	Original release date
14	1	"Night of the Lights"	Jon Rosenbaum	John Tartaglia, Matt Fusfeld & Alex Cuthbertson	November 18, 2022
It's the Night of the Lights, the most Fraggily holiday of the year, and the Rock is filled with songs and cheer. When Jamdolin (voiced by Daveed Diggs) encourages Wembley to make a special wish, the Fraggles head out on an adventure to find the brightest light and, maybe, the true meaning of the holiday.

=== Season 2 (2024) ===
No. overall	No. in season	Title	Directed by	Written by	Original release date
15	1	"The Great Wind"	Jordan Canning	Matt Fusfeld & Alex Cuthbertson	March 29, 2024
Doc's wind power experiments create windstorms in the Rock that cause Wembley great distress. Gobo tries to reassure him that there's nothing to worry about. Meanwhile, Pa Gorg forbids Junior from interacting with the Fraggles, and Uncle Traveling Matt returns from Outer Space with his latest discovery: strawberries (or, as Matt designates them, "sweet radishes").
16	2	"The Twisty-Turny-Thon"	Paul Fox	Maurin Mwombela	March 29, 2024
Red thinks she'll be a shoo-in for the Twisty-Turny-Thon race, but the windstorms have created obstacles in her established route. Wembley lets the leftover wind gusts (or "gusties") determine his path, and he encourages Red to do the same. Elsewhere, Gobo gives Junior Gorg a souvenir from Uncle Traveling Matt, the Doozers look for a way to detect wind so they can power their turbine, and Sprocket has to adjust to Doc's new work schedule.
17	3	"When Mokey Met Lanford"	Jordan Canning	John Tartaglia	March 29, 2024
Mokey takes in a plant that was uprooted by the wind. She names him Lanford and starts devoting all of her attention to him, which concerns her friends. Cotterpin goes overboard installing wind chimes everywhere, including one near the hole to the workshop, catching Doc and Sprocket's attention. Junior Gorg discovers strawberries sprouting in the garden.
18	4	"The Repeatee Birds"	Jordan Canning	Douglas Lyons	March 29, 2024
When strawberries distract the Fraggles from Boober's "Radish Razzle" experience, Boober uses the Repeatee Birds to spread gossip, causing a Fraggle furor over whether radishes or strawberries are better. Cotterpin and Architect are also split on strawberries, so the Doozers do extensive testing before using them as building material. Meanwhile, Doc reprograms her robotic likeness; this time not to dog-sit Sprocket, but to help with her volunteer teaching.
19	5	"I'm Pogey"	John Tartaglia	Charley Feldman	March 29, 2024
Wembley develops a new look using Mokey's old robe, but his reflections tell him he can only express himself in one way. Later, he and Pogey meet The Great Glitterini, a transformative creature who shows them they can express themselves however they want to. Meanwhile, Pa Gorg has Junior take part in the sacred Gorg tradition of Boxing Day (involving actual boxes), and Doc is embarrassed by an old video of her singing.
20	6	"Mezzo: Live in Concert"	Jordan Canning	Annalise Tahran	March 29, 2024
Mezzo is performing for one night only in Fraggle Rock, and superfan Gobo is eager to clear Concert Cave for her presence. He shoos away the Doozers and a swarm of bugs, who turn out to be Mezzo and her band. Meanwhile, the Gorgs look to enlarge their crop of strawberries, and Doc helps Sprocket overcome his fear of bees.
21	7	"This for That"	Jordan Canning	Jocelyn Stevenson	March 29, 2024
Mokey meets a Fraggle named Pryce, who comes from a distant community that operates on a "this for that" trading system. The two introduce the concept to Fraggle Rock, with mixed results. Meanwhile, Doc is given a lucrative job offer and weighs the pros and cons of accepting it.
22	8	"Colder Boulders"	Paul Fox	Maurin Mwombela	March 29, 2024
Red becomes annoyed with the gusties, so she decides to board up the Great Hall, preventing airflow and causing extreme heat. Determined to cool everyone off without unsealing the Hall, Red discovers a colder boulder that Icy Joe keeps in her cave. Red goes off to find more colder boulders, not listening to Icy Joe's warning about respecting the ecosystem. Elsewhere, the Doozers and the Gorgs devise their own delivery systems to transport the enlarged strawberries, and Sprocket subscribes to a doggie treat delivery service.
23	9	"The Great Radish Ball"	Paul Fox	Sabrina Jalees	March 29, 2024
Boober has the most fun of any Fraggle at this year's radish celebration, but disaster strikes when Icy Joe informs everyone that there are no more radishes, not even in the Gorgs' Garden. While frenziedly looking for more radishes, Boober uncovers a tube that turns out to be a time portal to the start of the Great Radish Ball. The Fraggle Five keep jumping down the tube to relive the festivities. Cotterpin finds the Doozers' strawberry delivery service repetitive and develops a way to regrow radishes. Meanwhile, Doc and Sprocket have a never-ending pillow party.
24	10	"Fraggle Up"	Jon Rosenbaum	Douglas Lyons	March 29, 2024
Cotterpin's method of regrowing radishes will take many months to produce results, so Gobo takes charge in searching for radishes. In his leadership, Gobo takes his Uncle Matt's advice and pushes his feelings down. Misinterpreting Marjory the Trash Heap's advice, Gobo directs the others to dig underground for radishes, just as a dust storm — caused by the Gorgs raking up their garden — fills the Great Hall. Meanwhile, Doc has promised to watch Fluffinella for Mrs. Shimmelfinney, and Sprocket tries hiding his fear and acting tough.
25	11	"Lost and Found Fraggles"	Jon Rosenbaum	Charley Feldman	March 29, 2024
Continuing from the previous episode, the Fraggle Five (along with Cotterpin and Lanford) happen on the underground cave of the Lost Fraggles, who are led by their Leader. The Fraggles pal around with their Lost Fraggle counterparts, with the pointed exception of Mokey, and they learn the true origin of the radishes. Elsewhere, Ma Gorg laments her woes to Marjory the Trash Heap, and Sprocket tampers with Doc's turbine model after being told not to.
26	12	"Letting Go"	J. J. Johnson	Annalise Tahran	March 29, 2024
Mokey is posed with the challenge of having to part with Lanford when a special plant is required to help revitalize the Gorgs' Garden. Meanwhile, Doc reluctantly lets Sprocket go to Doggy Day Camp.
27	13	"Hope and Socks"	J. J. Johnson	John Tartaglia	March 29, 2024
Red becomes uncharacteristically hopeful in everyone's ability to power the windmill in the Gorgs' Garden, but she completely loses hope when their first attempt doesn't work. Meanwhile, Doc is stuck on creating a new workable design for an offshore turbine. K-pop group Aespa make a special appearance during Uncle Traveling Matt's postcard.

=== Christmas Special (2025) ===
No. overall	No. in season	Title	Directed by	Written by	Original release date
28	1	"The First Snow of Fraggle Rock"	Jon Rosenbaum	Matt Fusfeld & Alex Cuthbertson	December 5, 2025

=== Christmas Special (2026) ===
No. overall	No. in season	Title	Directed by	Written by	Original release date
29	1	"Fraggle Rock: A Holiday Gift"	John Tartaglia	Matt Fusfeld & Alex Cuthbertson	December 4, 2026

== Cast ==
- Lilli Cooper as Doc

=== Puppeteers ===
- John Tartaglia as Gobo Fraggle, Sprocket, Architect Doozer, Gunge, Barry Blueberry, and Lyle Craggle (puppetry only)
- Karen Prell as Red Fraggle, Icy Joe, Merggle Queen (puppetry only), and Princess Gorg (eye performance only)
- Donna Kimball as Mokey Fraggle, Cotterpin Doozer, and Storyteller Fraggle
- Jordan Lockhart as Wembley Fraggle, and Murray the Minstrel
- Frank Meschkuleit as Boober Fraggle (puppetry only), Uncle Traveling Matt (puppetry only in select episodes), The World's Oldest Fraggle (puppetry only), Pa Gorg (face and voice performance), Large Marvin Fraggle, and Mantivore
- Aymee Garcia as Ma Gorg (face and voice performance), Archivist (puppetry only), Marjorie the Trash Heap, Brool the Minstrel, Henchy Fraggle, Bongo, and Styles Craggle
- Dan Garza as Junior Gorg (face and voice performance), Philo, and Kyle Craggle
- Ali J. Eisner as Turbo Doozer, Jack Hammer Doozer (puppetry only), Joogie the Inkspot, and Balsam the Minstrel
- Kira Hall as Brio the Minstrel, Princess Gorg
- Kanja Chen as Pogey
- Kevin Clash as Uncle Traveling Matt (puppetry only in select episodes)
- Andy Hayward as Pa Gorg (in-suit performance), Wrench Doozer, Jamdolin (puppetry only), Rupert Fraggle, and Giant Talking Radish
- Ingrid Hansen as Ma Gorg (in-suit performance), and Skitter Stone
- Ben Durocher as Junior Gorg (in-suit performance)
- Anna Cummer as Additional puppeteer

=== Voices ===
- Dave Goelz as Boober Fraggle, Uncle Traveling Matt and The World's Oldest Fraggle
- Daveed Diggs as Jamdolin
- Cynthia Erivo as Archivist
- Ed Helms as Lyle Craggle
- Patti LaBelle as Merggle Queen
- Kenan Thompson as Jack Hammer Doozer
- Brett Goldstein as Pryce Fraggle
- Catherine O'Hara as Lost Fraggles Leader
- Adam Lambert as The Great Glitterini
- Ariana DeBose as Mezzo

== Production ==
On May 26, 2020, following the success of the Fraggle Rock: Rock On! shorts that were released in April 2020, Apple TV+ announced a deal with The Jim Henson Company to produce a full reboot of Fraggle Rock, consisting of half-hour episodes, in addition to exclusive streaming rights to the original series and specials. In January 2021, The Jim Henson Company announced that production had officially started on a reboot of the show. The show is filmed at the Calgary Film Centre. Each episode features original songs, and reprises of songs from the original series.

Pre-production on the series began in late 2020 with the working title Raphanis (derived from the Latin word for "radish"). Filming commenced on January 25, 2021, in-studio at the Calgary Film Centre in Calgary, Alberta, Canada and wrapped in June.

In November 2021, a trailer revealed the Fraggle Rock: Back to the Rock title, and the January 21, 2022 premiere date.

Several original characters return, and new characters are voiced by celebrity guests, including Patti LaBelle, Cynthia Erivo, Daveed Diggs, Ed Helms, and Kenan Thompson. Foo Fighters make a cameo in one episode.

== Reception ==
=== Critical response ===
On review aggregator Rotten Tomatoes, the series holds a score of 100% based on 14 reviews, with an average rating of 8.1/10. The website's critics consensus reads, "Back to the Rock gives Jim Henson's beloved production a brand new fleece that fits just right, sure to delight longtime fans while enthralling a whole new generation." On Metacritic, the series has a weighted average score of 89 out of 100 based on eight critics, indicating "universal acclaim".

=== Accolades ===
The show won Outstanding Art Direction at the 1st Children's and Family Emmy Awards and received three additional nominations for Outstanding Children's or Family Viewing Series, Outstanding Cinematography and Outstanding Editing.

== Live production ==
On March 22, 2024, The Jim Henson Company announced a live musical stage-show adaptation of the series, Fraggle Rock: Back to the Rock Live. The production was written, choreographed, and directed by John Tartaglia, and produced by Heather Henson. It began touring on January 18, 2025, and toured its first leg through May 11, 2025.

After an Off-Broadway run at the New Victory Theater in the summer of 2026, it began its second leg on September 18, 2026, and will continue through November 29, 2026.
