= Fraggle Rock: The Animated Series =

- Created by: Jim Henson
- Developed by: John Semper; Cynthia Friedlob
- Directed by: Vonnie Batson; Rudy Cataldi; Charlie Downs; Eileen Dunn; Bob Kirk; Al Kouzel; Margaret Nichols; Stan Phillips; Tom Ray; Bob Treat; Neal Warner; John David Wilson; Warren Batchelder
- Voices of: Bob Bergen; Townsend Coleman; Barbara Goodson; Michael Laskin; Mona Marshall; Patricia Parris; Rob Paulsen; Patrick Pinney; Stu Rosen; John Stephenson
- Theme music composer: Margaret Loesch
- Opening theme: "Down at Fraggle Rock"
- Ending theme: "Down at Fraggle Rock" (instrumental)
- Composer: Robert J. Walsh
- Country of origin: United States
- Original language: English
- No. of seasons: 1
- No. of episodes: 13

Production
- Executive producers: Jim Henson; Margaret Loesch
- Producer: Mark Johnson
- Running time: 23 minutes
- Production companies: Marvel Productions; Jim Henson Productions; AKOM Production Ltd. (Overseas animation work)

Original release
- Network: NBC
- Release: September 12 – December 5, 1987

Related
- Fraggle Rock; Muppet Babies (1984)

Jim Henson's Fraggle Rock (later marketed as Fraggle Rock: The Animated Series) is an American animated children's television series based on the original live-action version of the same name created by Jim Henson. NBC aired this spin-off program on Saturday mornings at 10:00 AM (later moved to 11:00 AM) for one season during 1987. It was later shown in reruns on Disney Channel from May 5, 1990 to June 1995.

== Synopsis ==
The animated series followed the same formula as the HBO original live-action series, including the same theme song but re-recorded with the cartoon character voice actors. Many episodes consisted of two 15-minute stories; however, a few presented a single full 30-minute plot. The animated version carried on the tradition of original songs, with at least one tune per episode (including a few recycled from the puppet version, such as "Let Me Be Your Song").

In its original run, the animated episodes were bookended by footage of the original puppet version of Uncle Traveling Matt, introducing the show from Doc's workshop. The animated version of Fraggle Rock consisted of 13 episodes.

The most noticeable difference is that, unlike the live-action version, the animated version of Doc is shown from the neck down, much like Nanny on Muppet Babies.

== Voice cast ==
- Bob Bergen as Wembley Fraggle, Additional Voices
- Townsend Coleman as Gobo Fraggle, Wrench Doozer, Architect Doozer, Additional Voices
- Barbara Goodson as Red Fraggle, Wingnut Doozer, Additional Voices
- Michael Laskin as Junior Gorg
- Mona Marshall as Mokey Fraggle, Cotterpin Doozer, Additional Voices
- Patti Parris as Ma Gorg, Additional Voices
- Rob Paulsen as Boober Fraggle, Additional Voices
- Patrick Pinney as Uncle Traveling Matt, Pa Gorg, Flange Doozer, Additional Voices
- Stu Rosen as Storyteller Fraggle
- John Stephenson as Jerome "Doc" Crystal, Philo, Gunge, Additional Voices

== Episodes ==
No.	Title	Written by	Original release date
1	"No Fraggle Is an Island"	John Semper, Cynthia Friedlob & Barry O'Brien	September 12, 1987
Boober is fed up because Fraggle Rock is too crowded, causing the other Fraggles to move away and live alone. When the sleeping Slurp is awakened and takes over Fraggle Rock, the lonely Fraggles must rally up and get the Slurp out so they can reclaim their home. Meanwhile, Doc builds a doghouse for Sprocket.
2	"Big Trouble for a Little Fraggle"	Written by : Betty Birney; Story by : Pam Dovale and John Semper	September 19, 1987
2	"Necessity Is the Fraggle of Invention"	Allan Swayze	September 19, 1987
Big Trouble for a Little Fraggle: When a magic stone starts to make Wembley grow fast, he runs out of Fraggle Rock and into the Gorgs' Garden where Junior Gorg mistakes him for a cousin Gorg. Meanwhile, Sprocket tries to use a plant-growing light after he was insulted by Ned Shimmelfinney. Necessity is the Fraggle of Invention: Wembley has a hard time coming up with an invention for Fantastic Fraggle Think It Up Day. He does manage to come up with an invention when impending doom descends on Marjory the Trash Heap.
3	"The Great Radish Round Up"	Written by : Betty Birney, John Semper, and Cynthia Friedlob; Story by : Alan Swayze	September 26, 1987
3	"Lucky Fargy"	Written by : Betty Birney; Story by : Alan Swayze	September 26, 1987
The Great Radish Round Up: Pa Gorg has Junior Gorg replace all the radishes with Banoony Berries (the very smell of which can make Fraggles sick) and placed all the radishes in the shed. Inspired by one of Uncle Traveling Matt's postcards about cowboys, Gobo, Mokey, Wembley, Boober, and Red plan to use hats to lure the radishes back to them. The Doozers also have a plan to reclaim the radishes since Banoony Berries also makes them sick. Lucky Fargy: Boober obtains a lucky rag doll made by Mokey until Wembley accidentally drops it down a pit.
4	"A Fraggle for All Seasons"	Written by : Larry Parr; Story by : Pam Dovale	October 3, 1987
4	"A Growing Relationship"	Misty Stewart-Taggart	October 3, 1987
A Fraggle for All Season: Inspired by the ancient Fraggle philosophers, Mokey decides to find a Fraggle for All Seasons yet finds possible candidates in her four friends. A Growing Relationship: Red's entry for a flower contest ends up being a plant from Doc's workshop which soon starts to grow out of control.
5	"The Best of the Best"	Written by : Barry O'Brien; Story by : Chuck Lorre	October 10, 1987
5	"Where No Fraggle Has Gone Before"	Written by : Betty Birney; Story by : John Semper	October 10, 1987
The Best of the Best: Red's own Record-Breaking Day occurs as she tries to break last year's records which causes problems for her four friends. Where No Fraggle Has Gone Before: Gobo and Wembley make an expedition to climb to the tallest spire of the Gorg's castle in order to reach the top of the Universe.
6	"Gobo's Song"	Written by : Betty Birney; Story by : John Semper and Cynthia Friedlob	October 17, 1987
6	"Wembley and the Bemble"	Mel Gilden	October 17, 1987
Gobo's Song: When Gobo begins to question his importance of drawing up maps, he is visited by Cantus the Minstrel. Cantus places Gobo into a trance where Gobo awakens in the time of prehistoric Fraggles where he befriends prehistoric versions of his four friends. Wembley and the Bemble: Following a scary tale from Storyteller Fraggle, Wembley becomes afraid of the legendary Bemble.
7	"Ambassador Gorg"	Bill Prady	October 24, 1987
7	"Homebody Matt"	Written by : Cynthia Friedlob and John Sempler; Story by : Mark McClellan	October 24, 1987
Ambassador Gorg: Tired of having to fight the "enemy," Pa Gorg sends Junior Gorg to the enemy side in order to invite them to a peace treaty. When Junior doesn't find the enemy, he leaves the invitation at the entrance to Fraggle Rock. Homebody Matt: Upon a return from Outer Space, Uncle Traveling Matt ends up hitting his head and forgets that he is an explorer. Gobo tries to help his uncle regain his memory of being an explorer.
8	"The Great Fraggle Freeze"	Anthony Adams, John Semper, and Cynthia Friedlob	October 31, 1987
When the heat goes down in Doc's workshop, it has a chilling effect on Fraggle Rock. With a round object given to him by Marjory the Trash Heap, Gobo sets off to the center of the Mystical Maze to set things right with the Doozers not far behind.
9	"Laundry Never Lies"	Kathryn Mullen, Larry Parr, John Semper, and Cynthia Friedlob	November 7, 1987
9	"What Boober's Nose Knows"	Dennis McCoy and Pamela Hickey	November 7, 1987
Laundry Never Lies: Wembley discovers Boober's special talent of detecting the odors on one's clothing when Boober does the laundry. What Boober's Nose Knows: When Boober's favorite sweet water disappears from the well, his nose leads him and his friends to the Gorgs' Castle where the sweet water is.
10	"Mokey's Flood of Creativity"	Written by : Pam Dovale; Story by : John Semper and Cynthia Friedlob	November 14, 1987
10	"What the Doozers Did"	Written by : Anthony L. Adams; Story by : John Semper and Cynthia Friedlob	November 14, 1987
Mokey's Flood of Creativity: Following the 100th Pipe Banging, Archbanger Fraggle wants a special ceremony and is persuaded to allow Mokey to recite a poem for the occasion. The recitation (or so the Fraggles assume) is the cause of a flood which spreads throughout the cavern. What the Doozers Did: In a tie-in to the "Mokey's Flood of Creativity," the glue that Cotterpin Doozer has stirred doesn't hold a Doozer Construction masterpiece much to the disappointment of Architect Doozer who scolds Cotterpin for shirking her duties by making her first floating Doozer construction. Lugnut Doozer and Rhinestone Doozer have their doubts on Cotterpin Doozer until a flood approaches Fraggle Rock.
11	"Red's Drippy Dilemma"	Mel Gilden and Jack Enyart	November 21, 1987
11	"Fraggle Babble"	Written by : Pam Dovale; Story by : John Semper	November 21, 1987
Red's Drippy Dilemma: Red is preparing for her latest swimming extravaganza as a nearby pipe springs a leak. Fraggle Babble: Upon enjoying making up new words for the Fraggle dictionary, Mokey enlists the aid of Convincing John to convince everyone to make up a new vocabulary.
12	"The Radish Fairy"	Marv Wolfman and Donna Kuyper	November 28, 1987
12	"The Funniest Joke in the Universe"	Written by : Mark McClellan; Story by : John Semper and Cynthia Friedlob	November 28, 1987
The Radish Fairy: Dressed as the Radish Fairy, Red convinces Junior Gorg to place all the radishes in Fraggle Rock to evade a Radish Famine. The Funniest Joke in the Universe: Boober finds the Funniest Joke in the Universe that causes any Fraggle that listens to it to laugh endlessly.
13	"Fraggle Fool's Day"	Written by : Bill Prady; Story by : Marta Fields	December 5, 1987
13	"Wembley's Trip to Outer Space"	Written by : Marv Wolfman and Donna Kuyper; Story by : Mike Joens, John Semper, and Cynthia Friedlob	December 5, 1987
Fraggle Fool's Day: Red gets caught up in the practical jokes of Fraggle Fool's Day. One of her jokes backfires leaving her and Mokey trapped in the Gorgs' Garden. Wembley's Trip to Outer Space: Upon making too many decisive decisions, Wembley comes down with a case of Wembliosis and the only cure for it is a good scare.

== Crew ==
- John Semper and Cynthia Friedlob - Head Writers / Showrunners
- Stu Rosen - Voice Director

== Home media ==
The series was released on VHS in the UK by Palace Video. Two tapes were released, each featuring two full episodes. The first two episodes were released in the UK on a single-disc DVD titled "Dance Your Cares Away!" by HIT Entertainment in 2005.

The show's first US home media release was on January 19, 2010, when Lionsgate Home Entertainment released the complete series on a two-disc set. On July 11, 2018, Sony Pictures Home Entertainment announced a 12-disc complete series Blu-ray set of the main Fraggle Rock series with all 13 episodes of the animated series to be included as well. It was released on September 25, 2018. They also released a separate 2-disc set of the animated series on the same day.
