= Tim Gosley =

Canadian puppeteer

Tim Gosley is a Canadian puppeteer who is primarily known for his work on numerous Muppet productions. He is originally from Victoria, British Columbia. Gosley earned a Bachelor of Fine Arts in acting from the University of Alberta and studied puppeteering with Richard Hunt from 1981 to 1983. He began his career portraying several minor characters on the television program Fraggle Rock from 1983 to 1987. He then began portraying Basil the polar bear on Sesame Park, the Canadian version of Sesame Street, a role he performed regularly for nine seasons.

In 1984, Gosley was the puppeteer for a honker in the film Sesame Street Presents: Follow That Bird. His other television and film credits include Blizzard Island, Iris the Happy Professor, Little Star, St. Bear's Dolls Hospital, Basil Hears a Noise, Wumpa's World and Caillou. He has also worked as a writer for the animated television series Fix & Foxi and Friends.

In 2003, Gosley won a Gemini Award for best preschool puppet performance. He has also presented several shadow puppet performances and has toured with his one-man puppet show version of The Ugly Duckling. In 2006, he presented The Fourth Wise Man, a Christmas puppet show starring an old shoe.

== Sources ==
- C.P. "Anonymous Star Likes it That Way." The Globe and Mail (Canada). January 3, 1989
