= Kathryn Mullen =

American puppeteer (born 1940)

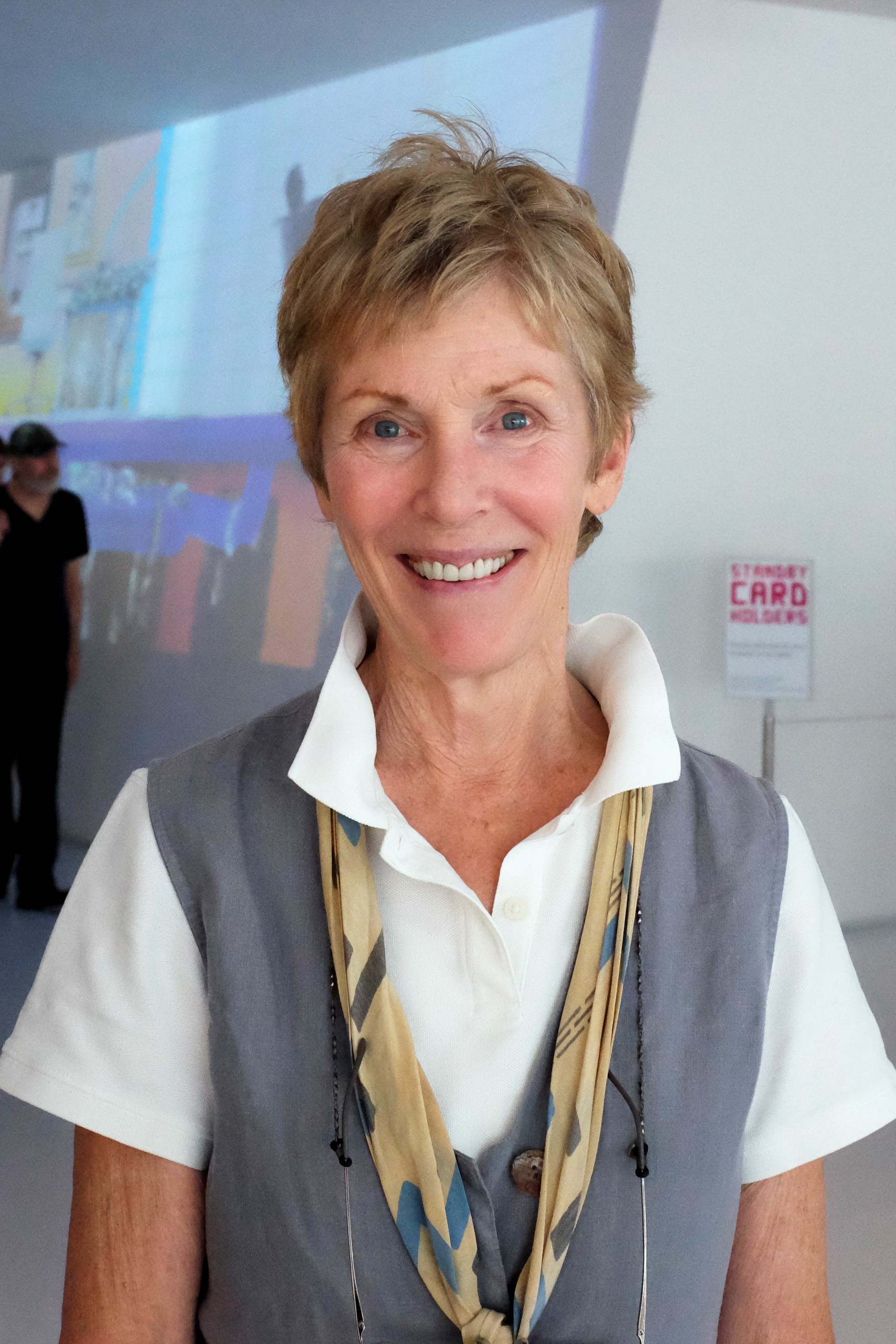
- Mullen in 2015
- Born: February 10, 1940 (age 86); New York City, U.S.
- Occupations: Puppeteer, actress, voice actress
- Years active: 1978–present
- Spouse: Michael K. Frith

Kathryn Mullen (born February 10, 1940) is an American puppeteer, actress, and voice actress most closely associated with Jim Henson projects.

== History ==
Mullen began performing on The Muppet Show in its third season, primarily as Gaffer the Backstage Cat. She also voice directed Dog City for Nelvana, worked as a designer for The Muppet Movie, right-handed for Frank Oz on Yoda on The Empire Strikes Back, and was one of the creators of Between the Lions. While reprising Gaffer for several Muppet movies, she also performed Mokey Fraggle and Cotterpin Doozer on Henson's Fraggle Rock. She performed the Gelfling Kira in the movie The Dark Crystal, Allegra on Allegra's Window, and Leona the Lion on Between the Lions.

Mullen, with her husband, former Muppet designer Michael K. Frith, founded "No Strings" along with emergency aid worker Johnie McGlade. The company originally created a film for children in Afghanistan, warning of the dangers of land mines. In the film, "The Story of the Little Carpet Boy," one puppet loses several limbs before he learns to avoid land mines completely. Since the first film, No Strings has gone on to create films for children in need in areas including Africa, Haiti, Madagascar, Sudan, and Syria. In 2016 No Strings was awarded the 2016 Adela Dwyer-St. Thomas of Villanova Peace Award from Villanova University

In 2013, Mullen attended Dragon Con with Karen Prell and Frith as part of the 30th Anniversary of Fraggle Rock where Mullen performed Mokey Fraggle while Prell performed Red Fraggle.

== Filmography ==
=== Television ===
- Allegra's Window – Allegra
- Between the Lions – Leona Lion/Dog (logo only, 2000–2008)
- Fraggle Rock – Mokey Fraggle, Cotterpin Doozer, Rock Hockey Hanna, Merboo Merggle, Magenta Fraggle, Mother Goose, A Pink Dancing Fraggle, Old Gypsy Lady, Wimple Fraggle, Mama Tree Bird, Sally Spotless, Tammy Shrub, Additional Muppets
- Jim Henson's Little Muppet Monsters – Penguin, Rat
- Sesame Street – Grover's Mommy, Sally Smith, Additional Muppets
- The Muppet Show – Wanda (1979) Gaffer the Cat, Mrs. Appleby, Prairie Dog, Beaker Clones, Additional Muppets
- The Wubbulous World of Dr. Seuss – Little Cat A (1996–1997), Junior Kangaroo (1996–1997), Morton the Elephant Bird (1996–1997), Mayor Stovepipe, Lieutenant Hopwood, Mrs. Casaba, Additional Muppets

=== Film ===
- A Muppet Family Christmas – Mokey Fraggle, Additional Muppets
- Billy Bunny's Animal Songs – Billy Bunny's Mother, Frog, Gopher
- John Denver and the Muppets: A Christmas Together – Additional Muppets
- Labyrinth – Goblins (puppeteer)
- Sesame Street Presents: Follow That Bird – Grouch Diner Patron, Anything Muppet Girl
- The Christmas Toy – Apple
- The Dark Crystal – Kira (puppeteer)
- The Empire Strikes Back - Performing assistant for Yoda
- The Great Muppet Caper – Gaffer the Cat, Additional Muppets
- The Muppet Movie – Additional Muppets
- The Muppets Celebrate Jim Henson – Joy Buzzer, Mokey Fraggle, Additional Muppets
- The Muppets Go Hollywood – Additional Muppets
- The Muppets Go to the Movies – Additional Muppets
- The Muppets Take Manhattan – Jill the Frog, Additional Muppets

Preceded by Eren Ozker	Wanda (Muppet); 1979	Succeeded by Alice Dinnean
Preceded by None	Mokey Fraggle; 1983–2013	Succeeded by Donna Kimball
Preceded by None	Cotterpin Doozer; 1984-1993	Succeeded by Donna Kimball
