= Michael K. Frith =

British artist and television producer (born 1941)

- Born: Michael Kingsbury Frith; 8 July 1941 (age 85); Hamilton, Bermuda
- Education: Harvard College
- Occupations: director, consultant, designer, producer, creator, writer, illustrator, and technician
- Spouse: Kathryn Mullen

Michael Kingsbury Frith (born 8 July 1941) is a British artist and television producer. He is the former executive vice-president and creative director of The Jim Henson Company. His contributions to Muppet projects have been extensive and varied.

== Biography ==
Frith was born in Bermuda and educated at Harvard College, from which he graduated in 1963. He and Christopher Cerf co-wrote Alligator, the 1962 Harvard Lampoon parody of James Bond novels. Later he illustrated the front cover of Bored of the Rings, the 1969 Lampoon parody of The Lord of the Rings. According to Frith, he designed the emblem for the Lampoon.

Frith began his career at Random House in 1963 as a children's book illustrator and editor. He was editor-in-chief of the Beginner Books series, the line of books created by Theodor Seuss Geisel, Dr. Seuss. He was also Dr. Seuss's book editor and close personal friend.

In 1971, when Random House began publishing Sesame Street books, Frith was named editor and art director of the Sesame series. He produced a series of five annual large-format Sesame Street Storybooks, and contributed artwork for four of them: The Sesame Street Storybook (1971), The Sesame Street 1, 2, 3 Storybook (1973), The Sesame Street ABC Storybook (1974), and Big Bird's Busy Book (1975). Appreciating Frith's talents as a designer, Jim Henson brought him on board his creative team. One of Frith's early projects was designing characters for The Land of Gorch, a segment of Saturday Night Live.

Frith recalled his beginnings with the Muppets in The Saturday Evening Post (December 1980): "The first drawings I ever worked on were characters for Saturday Night Live. The Muppets did regular segments for a season featuring characters about as far removed from Sesame Street as you could get. Jim asked me to come over one day to talk about creating Muppet personalities—specifically, strange, mossy, warty creatures. Instead of traditional ones with cartoon eyes—round, white and black—he had become fascinated with taxidermist eyes: cow, camel and tiger eyes. Around this simple concept of a different eye evolved a whole new concept which led to the creation of the crazy-eyed loonies we enjoy today."

He joined Henson Associates full-time as Art Director in 1975. He was named vice-president in 1978, and executive vice-president and director of creative services in 1985. After the success of "The Muppet Show" series Henson wanted Frith, along with two other Muppet Show stalwarts Jerry Juhl, Jocelyn Stevenson (both writers) and newcomer to the Henson productions Duncan Kenworthy (producer), to create a new children's show which would appeal to a much wider international audience."Fraggle Rock" is the new show which emerged and subsequently ran for 4 seasons totaling 96 episodes between January 10, 1983 and March 30, 1987. This new show centered on "Muppet" creatures known as Fraggles, who live underground along with several other species of creature such as Doozers and Gorgs. He designed many of the creatures and settings which existed in this universe. He explains that he drew on two major parts of his background when creating the "look" of the show, the first his many years in working with Ted Geisel (Dr. Seuss) on several children's books and the second being his growing up in Bermuda.

In October 1995, Frith left Henson Productions to start a new company, Sirius Thinking, Ltd., with John Sculley, Christopher Cerf and Norman Stiles. Sirius is the multi-media children's education company that created Between the Lions, an award-winning educational puppet show on PBS, in 2000. Frith served as the executive producer, creative director, conceptual designer and co-creator of the show.

Frith, along with his wife, Muppet performer Kathryn Mullen, founded "No Strings" along with emergency aid worker Johnie McGlade. The company originally created a film for children in Afghanistan, warning of the dangers of land mines. In the film, "The Story of the Little Carpet Boy", one puppet loses several limbs before he learns to avoid land mines completely. Since the first film, No Strings has gone on to create films for children in need in areas including Africa, Haiti, Madagascar, Sudan, and Syria. In 2016 No Strings was awarded the 2016 Adela Dwyer-St. Thomas of Villanova Peace Award from Villanova University.

== Frith's projects and credits ==
=== Film and television ===
- Sesame Street, creative and design consultant (1969-)
- Julie on Sesame Street, creative consultant (1973)
- The Muppet Show, creative and design consultant; designed Dr. Teeth, Floyd Pepper, Janice, the Swedish Chef, Uncle Deadly, Scooter, Angus McGonagle, and more (1976–1981)
- Emmet Otter's Jug-Band Christmas, creative consultant, designed Doc Bullfrog and others (1977)
- The Muppet Movie, design consultant (1979)
- Miss Piggy Calendars, art director (1980–1984)
- The Great Muppet Caper, design consultant (1981)
- Miss Piggy's Guide to Life, art director (1981)
- Fraggle Rock, conceptual designer (1983–1987)
- The Muppets Take Manhattan, design consultant; designed the Muppet Babies (1984)
- Muppet Babies, creative consultant and executive producer (1984–1991)
- Follow That Bird, new character designer (1985)
- Little Muppet Monsters, creative producer (1985)
- The Jim Henson Hour, design consultant (1989)
- Muppet*Vision 3D, creative consultant (1991)
- The Muppet Christmas Carol, design consultant (1992)
- Jim Henson's Dog City, executive producer (1992–1995)
- Mr. Willowby's Christmas Tree, executive producer (1995)
- Muppet Treasure Island, design consultant (1996)
- The Wubbulous World of Dr. Seuss, executive producer (1996–1998)
- Between the Lions, executive producer, creative director, conceptional designer, and co-creator (2000–2010)
- Gus and Inky, executive producer, creative director, conceptional designer, and co-creator
- Lomax, The Hound of Music, executive producer, creative director, conceptional designer, and co-creator (2007–08)

=== Books written or illustrated ===
- Alligator (Harvard Lampoon, 1962), by Christopher Cerf and Frith as I*N FL*M*NG – parody of James Bond novels by Ian Fleming
- Bored of the Rings (Signet/ New American Library, 1969), cover illustration by Frith – Harvard Lampoon parody of The Lord of the Rings
- The Sesame Street Storybook (1971)
- Some of Us Walk ... Some Fly ... Some Swim (Random House/ Beginner Books, 1971), written and ill. by Frith
- The Sesame Street 1, 2, 3 Storybook (1973)
- I'll Teach My Dog 100 Words (Bright and Early Books, 1973), illus. P. D. Eastman
- My Amazing Book of ... Autographs! (1974)
- The Sesame Street ABC Storybook (1974)
- Big Bird's Busy Book (1975)
- Because a Little Bug Went Ka-choo (Beginner, 1975), written by Dr. Seuss as Rosetta Stone, OCLC 1528276
- Autographs! I Collect Them! (1990)

Animals Do the Strangest Things – series of Random House Step-Up Books written by Leonora Hornblow and Arthur Hornblow, illustrated by Frith

- Animals Do the Strangest Things (Random House, 1964), OCLC 310155
- Birds Do the Strangest Things (1965)
- Fish Do the Strangest Things (1966)
- Insects Do the Strangest Things (1968)
- Reptiles Do the Strangest Things (1970)
- Prehistoric Monsters Do the Strangest Things (1974)
