= John Henson (puppeteer) =

American puppeteer (1965–2014)

- Born: John Paul Henson; April 25, 1965; Greenwich, Connecticut, U.S.
- Died: February 14, 2014 (aged 48); Saugerties, New York, U.S.
- Occupation: Puppeteer
- Years active: 1989–2005
- Spouse: Gyongyi Henson (m. 2007)
- Children: 2
- Parent(s): Jim Henson; Jane Henson
- Relatives: Lisa Henson (sister); Cheryl Henson (sister); Brian Henson (brother); Heather Henson (sister)

John Paul Henson (April 25, 1965 – February 14, 2014) was an American puppeteer. He was best known for his association with the Muppets.

== Early years ==
Henson was the son of puppeteer Jim Henson (1936–1990), best known as the creator of the Muppets, and Jane Henson (1934–2013), who assisted in the launch of the Muppets. He had four siblings: Lisa (born 1960), Cheryl (born 1961), Brian (born 1963) and Heather (born 1970).

== Career ==
As a child, Henson appeared in his father's Numerosity films for Sesame Street as a boy showcasing "10 bells" and in the film "Memories" for Bufferin as the narrator's son. Henson told biographer Brian Jay Jones that he was "a strange kid" with "an endless energy." According to Henson, "if you look at the old home movies, everyone's around and every once in a while you'd see this little blond blur just careen through the frame; that was me. I was just always going―and the faster the better."

In an October 1987 interview with The Washington Post, Jim Henson spoke of his children and their work within the company; of John, Henson said: "John, the second youngest, does some work with us in New York, performing some of the big characters we do, such as Sweetums."

By the late 1980s, Henson had taken over performing the body suit puppetry for Sweetums as Richard Hunt had become physically unable to do so. Hunt continued performing the dialogue for Sweetums until his death in 1992, after which Henson took over the character completely. Henson performed the part in Muppet*Vision 3D, with the dialogue looped by Hunt. In appearances after Hunt's death, such as the featured role in Muppet Treasure Island, Henson supplied both the puppetry and the voice. Henson was the primary performer of Sweetums for over a decade; his last performance of the character was for The Muppets' Wizard of Oz in 2005. The character has since transitioned to other performers.

In addition to his performances in television and film projects, Henson made live appearances as Sweetums for a number of events, including a 1992 musical tribute to Jim Henson at Lincoln Center, the MuppetFest weekend in 2001, and at the unveiling ceremony for Kermit the Frog's star on The Hollywood Walk of Fame in 2002. Henson also made appearances in the original Coca-Cola Polar Bear suit built by Jim Henson's Creature Shop for Coca-Cola public relations tours, which sometimes involved the bear sledding and skiing.

After Jim Henson's death in 1990, John, along with his brother and sisters, became a shareholder and active board member in The Jim Henson Company. He stayed involved in the company until his death in 2014.

=== Home design and sculptures ===
Cheryl Henson described her brother as an "artist who also loved working the land." Biographer Brian Jay Jones described Henson, stating: "he was more of an artist. He renovated a turn-of-the-century schoolhouse, making every surface in the house interesting and beautiful. He had his dad's mentality in that he was so detail-oriented."

In the early 1980s, at the age of 16, Henson bought an old school house in Saugerties, New York with his friend John Kahn. As an artist, fabricator, inventor and engineer, Kahn trained Henson in the arts of home building, furniture design, and sculpture. These disciplines would become Henson's primary trade and life's work. He became "a master in three-dimensional spatial design" and owned and developed many properties in Saugerties that reflected his unique design aesthetics.

A 2014 statement from the Jim Henson Company described Henson's work in Saugerties, stating: "each of his buildings is an art project, an immersive experience balancing function with artistic expression. His exterior, and fine interior work, utilizing a wide range of materials; from wood, to metal, to stone, created rooms of exquisite embracing craftsmanship."

In the early 1980s, Henson, along with John Kahn, helped design and renovate the Henson Townhouse in New York and Jim Henson's personal residence in upstate New York. Henson and Kahn designed and built "The Great Hot Air Balloon Circus" to decorate the spiral staircase of the townhouse where the company was headquartered at the time. The large hanging sculpture began in the lobby at the base of the spiral staircase and continued up to the fourth floor. It consists of wire, wood, and metal, as well as PVC figures of the Muppets. The sculpture later went on display between the first and second floors of the flagship World of Disney store on Fifth Avenue in New York City in 2004. It remained there until the store closed; its current whereabouts are unknown.

Another of John Henson's sculptures welcomes visitors to the company's current New York workshop. Made of brass and other metallic, moving parts, the piece was based on one of his father's own sketches.

== Personal life ==
In 1996, Henson met his wife, Gyongyi Katona. The couple had two daughters Katrina (born 1996) and Sydney (born 2003). The Henson family described John Henson as "a loving, playful, and dedicated father, and was very involved in all aspects of his girls' lives."

He was a big fan of David Bowie, which bolstered Jim Henson's knowledge of Bowie's work and pushed his father to pursue Bowie instead of Sting for the role of Jareth in Labyrinth.

=== Death ===
On February 14, 2014, after building an igloo in the snow with his daughter, Henson suffered a sudden massive heart attack and died at his home in Saugerties; he was 48.

The Jim Henson Company confirmed Henson's passing on the Facebook page the next day, stating:

It is with great sadness that we confirm that John Henson, son of Jim and Jane Henson and brother to Lisa, Cheryl, Brian and Heather, died at age 48 of a sudden massive heart attack on Friday, February 14, while at home with his daughter. John served as a shareholder and board member of The Jim Henson Company. He leaves two daughters, Katrina (15) and Sydney (10) and his wife Gyongyi. A private service is being planned.

Following his death, his family conducted a private funeral for him. His body was cremated, and his ashes were given to his family.

=== Tributes ===
Biographer Brian Jay Jones said John Henson was "perhaps the most spiritual or ethereal of the Henson children." Henson's family later commented that "John had the deepest soul of any man alive; sensitive, artistic, and extremely compassionate, there was no limit to his love."

Arthur Novell, family friend and director of the Jim Henson Legacy, described Henson as, "a most remarkably kind and generous man who gave so much and asked for so little. He infused us with the light of his inquisitive mind, the spirit of his keen intellect and the genius of his talent to create. John will forever be remembered and cherished and talked about and somewhere in the Universe he will be rejoiced."

Director Kirk Thatcher wrote of Henson's passing, saying: "[John] had a huge heart, an easy laugh, a lopsided grin, twinkly impish eyes and a wild, creative streak that burned with a quiet intensity that shone through his life and art. He was a merry madman who played Sweetums in almost all of the Muppet projects I directed and he did it with the enthusiasm and silliness worthy of the big, sweet Ogre. I will miss him tremendously, but know that he's with his parents, Jim and Jane, heading off to make some crazy stuff with them in that infinite space that exists just beyond our physical senses, but we feel in our hearts."

Other colleagues of Henson's offered condolences to the Henson family on social media; Stephanie D'Abruzzo said she would "miss his smile." Tyler Bunch stated Henson "had a kind and singular spirit," and Paul Williams tweeted: "Prayers for the Henson family. And tears. Too sad."

The Muppets Studio released the following statement on the Muppet's official Facebook page following Henson's death:

John Henson, son of Muppet creator Jim Henson, passed away this week. Many of us who work with the Muppets knew John as a friend and a performer. His passing is a shock and a terrible loss. Like his father, John brought incredible optimism to everything he did. He pursued his dreams with great passion. Jim Henson once said, 'It’s a good life. Enjoy it.' John enjoyed life—and we enjoyed life more because of him. We will miss him deeply.

The Muppets Studios, The Walt Disney Company and all who strive every day to keep alive the magic of the Muppets offer our heartfelt sympathy to his wife and children and the entire Henson family."

Sesame Workshop released a statement on their official blog saying: "[John Henson] will be missed by his extended Sesame Workshop family."

== Filmography ==
=== Television ===
Year	Title	Role
1993–1994	CityKids	
1996–1998	Muppets Tonight	Sweetums

=== Film ===
Year	Title	Role
1990	Zelda, Catwoman of Queens	Producer and cowriter
1996	Muppet Treasure Island	Sweetums
1999	Muppets from Space	Sweetums
2002	It's a Very Merry Muppet Christmas Movie	Sweetums
2005	The Muppets' Wizard of Oz	Sweetums as a flying monkey; final role

=== Video games ===
Year	Title	Role
2003	Muppets Party Cruise	Sweetums

=== Miscellaneous ===
Year	Title	Role	Notes
1991	Muppet*Vision 3D	Sweetums	In-suit performer
2001	The Muppet Show Live	Sweetums	

Preceded by Richard Hunt	Performer of Sweetums; 1991, 1992–2005	Succeeded by Noel MacNeal
