= CityKids =

American television series

- Genre: Coming of age
- Created by: Jeffrey Solomon
- Written by: Jeffrey Solomon
- Directed by: Rick Friedberg, Randall Miller
- Starring: Cyndi Cartagena; Hassan Elgendi; Dulé Hill; Anne Ho; Renoly Santiago; Diana Smith; Brad Stoll; David Rudman; Joey Mazzarino; John Henson; Noel MacNeal; Don Reardon
- Voices of: Cenophia Mitchell; Elizabeth Regen
- Theme music composer: Raliegh J Neal II
- Opening theme: Malik Yoba & Raliegh J Neal II
- Composer: Raliegh J Neal II
- Country of origin: United States
- Original language: English
- No. of seasons: 1
- No. of episodes: 13

Production
- Executive producers: Brian Henson; Laurie Meadoff
- Running time: 30 minutes
- Production companies: Jim Henson Productions; The CityKids Foundation

Original release
- Network: ABC
- Release: September 18, 1993 – January 29, 1994

CityKids is an American live-action/puppet coming-of-age television series that aired on late Saturday mornings on ABC from 1993 to 1994. A co-production between the Jim Henson Company and Laurie Meadoff's CityKids Foundation, the show consists primarily of live action performances interspersed with Muppet segments, courtesy of Jim Henson Productions. These Muppets were original characters designed specifically for the show, and they often served as the Greek chorus for the show, commenting on the situations of the human characters, but not actually interacting with the cast.

Similar to NBC's attempt of pushing the adolescent programming for late Saturday mornings with Saved By the Bell since 1989, CityKids was the first (and eventually the last) late Saturday morning series on ABC primarily targeted to a teenage audience, as well as one of the earliest shows produced by the Jim Henson Company at that time to be aimed at an older audience, along with Dinosaurs. However, the show failed to generate desirable ratings from any demographic, especially the teenage one, and the show was cancelled by ABC after one season, consequently airing strictly children's programs on the network the following year. Nevertheless, the series remains a cult classic and a one-season wonder, and was praised for tackling issues rarely seen on TV at that time.

The show's main theme song was composed by Malik Yoba & Raleigh J. Neal II, both of whom also composed other songs for the series and served as Musical Creative Supervisor for the show.

== Plot ==
In New York City, a bunch of teenagers tackle different teen issues as different puppet characters help the teenage viewers from their point view. Neither the teenagers or the puppet characters interact with each other during each episode.

== Characters ==
=== Main Cast ===
- Angelica (portrayed by Cyndi Cartagena)
- Snoopy/Christian (portrayed by Hassan Elgendi)
- John (portrayed by Dulé Hill)
- Susan (portrayed by Anne Ho)
- Tito (portrayed by Renoly Santiago)
- Nikki (portrayed by Diana Smith)
- David (portrayed by Brad Stoll)
- Unknown Character (portrayed by Charlene Fergus) (pilot episode only)

=== Puppets ===
- Dread (performed by David Rudman) - A Rastafarian philosopher.
- Bird (performed by Joey Mazzarino) - A pigeon who is Dread's sidekick.
- Hot Dogs (various puppeteers) - A bunch of Hot Dogs that would perform songs. Their sketch would begin with a zoom in on the container they are being served in. The sketch ends with a bunch of tongs taking one of the hot dogs.
  - Frankie Frank (performed by David Rudman) - An anthropomorphic hot dog rapper who is the leader of Frankie Frank and the Footers.
- Captain (performed by Joey Mazzarino) - A character who works "Inside the Head" with Libido and Lieutenant. In the pilot, he had a more humanoid-like appearance.
- Libido (performed by John Henson) - A sex-crazed creature-like character in a cage that is black who works "Inside the Head" with Captain and Lieutenant. In the pilot, he didn't wear his signature black shirt.
- Lieutenant (performed by David Rudman) - A character who works "Inside the Head" with Captain and Libido. In newspaper promotions of CityKids and the pilot, the Lieutenant was shown to have originally been depicted as a red bespectacled monkey before they went with the puppet design that appeared in the show.
- Koozebanians (performed by Noel MacNeal and David Rudman) - A race of green aliens from the planet Koozebane. Two of them have two eyes while one of them has one eye.
- Dirt Sisters - Trish (performed by Joey Mazzarino, voiced by Elizabeth Regen) and Toya (performed by David Rudman, voiced by Cenophia Mitchell) are two gossipy girls that talk to each other on the phone and talk about the episode's main plot. Trish is from Staten Island while Toya is from Brooklyn.

== Episodes ==
No.	Title	Original release date
1	"Pilot"	18 September 1993
2	"Becoming a Man"	25 September 1993
3	"Get a Job"	2 October 1993
4	"The Curse of Ali Baba"	9 October 1993
5	"Bye, Bye Reputation"	16 October 1993
6	"The Mural"	23 October 1993
7	"Alterations with Attitude"	30 October 1993
8	"Quality Time"	13 November 1993
9	"Rooftop Thanksgiving"	20 November 1993
The teens think a family is going through hard times and work to help them out.
10	"Pack of Lies"	4 December 1993
11	"Love Letters on the Hudson"	11 December 1993
12	"All My Trials"	18 December 1993
13	"I Am Woman"	29 January 1994

== Cast ==
=== Puppeteers ===
- David Rudman as Dread, Frankie Frank, Lieutenant, Koozbanians, Toya
- Joey Mazzarino as Bird, Captain, Trish
- Noel MacNeal as Koozebanians
- John Henson as Libido
- Don Reardon
- Alison Mork
- Carmen Osbahr as Hot Dog
- Carlo Yanuzzi
- Camille Bonora (uncredited)
- Louise Gold (uncredited) (pilot episode)

== Later appearances ==
- The puppet for Bird later appeared in Muppet Time where he is the straight man for the Three Silly Bears in their segments. This pigeon was also performed by Joey Mazzarino.
- The puppets for Dread, Captain, Lieutenant, Libido (in his purple prototype appearance), the Hot Dogs, the Koozebanians, and the prototype Lieutenant later made appearances in the Puppet Up! shows and other Jim Henson projects.
- The puppets for the Koozebanians later made appearances in Duff's Happy Fun Bake Time.
