= Nativity Story (puppet play) =

Nativity Story is a re-telling of the Christmas story with puppets created by Jane Henson, the co-creator of The Muppets. It features live sacred music and a cast of puppets built by The Jim Henson Company.

== Background ==
Collaborating with many artistic hands, Jane Henson developed vignettes for Nativity Story at the 2009 Eugene O'Neill Puppetry Theatre Conference and premiered the full show at the Orlando Puppet Festival in 2010, partnering with daughter Heather Henson and Ibex Puppetry. She subsequently sponsored performances in Florida schools and churches, like Winter Garden's Episcopal Church of the Messiah as well as St. Margaret Mary Catholic School and St. John Evangelical Lutheran Church, both in Winter Park.

Henson died in 2013, but Nativity Story has continued to tour. The show has been seen at St. James Catholic Cathedral in Orlando, Florida; the Cathedral of St. Andrew in Grand Rapids, Michigan; and New York City's St. Paul the Apostle Church. There, several of its puppetry scenes were filmed for 2013’s nationally broadcast CBS Television special "A New York Christmas to Remember," co-produced by Paulist Productions and hosted by Regis Philbin.

The premiere at Orlando's St. James Cathedral featured actor-puppeteers Sarah Lockard, Anthony Bolante, Jenny Weaver Barbieri, Curtiss Mitchell, Russell Nauman, and Heather Henson, with set and lighting by Vandy Wood, direction and dramaturgy by Sean Keohane, and music by the Olde Noyse Trio: John Rata, Cecie Catron, and Craig Thomas.
