= Cheryl Henson =

American film producer (born 1961)

- Born: Cheryl Lee Henson; August 7, 1961 (age 65); United States
- Education: Yale University (BA)
- Occupations: Puppet builder, philanthropist, puppeteer, actress, producer
- Years active: 1971–present
- Notable work: Labyrinth; The Dark Crystal; The Muppet Show
- Title: President of Jim Henson Foundation
- Spouse: Edwin A. Finn Jr. (m. 2001)
- Children: 2
- Parents: Jim Henson (father); Jane Henson (mother)
- Family: Lisa Henson (sister); Brian Henson (brother); John Henson (brother); Heather Henson (sister)

Cheryl Lee Henson (born August 7, 1961) is an American puppet builder and philanthropist who has served as the president of the Jim Henson Foundation since 1992. A supporter of puppetry arts and artists, she serves as a board member of The Jim Henson Company. She was honored in 2010 at the LaMama Gala, and in 2011, she won the New Victory Arts Award for her leadership in puppetry.

== Early life ==
Henson is the second child of Jim Henson and Jane Henson. Lisa Henson (born 1960) is her older sister; Brian Henson (born 1963), John Henson (1965–2014), and Heather Henson (born 1970) are her younger siblings.

== Career ==
She began her career building puppets for The Muppet Show while still in high school. As she told Smithsonian Magazine in 2006. "They were singing fruits and vegetables – an artichoke, a bunch of asparagus and a grapefruit – for the fruit and vegetable stand that sang, 'Yes, we have no bananas.' My older sister, Lisa, made a tomato.", She also performed puppets for John Denver and the Muppets: A Christmas Together (1979) and built puppets for The Dark Crystal (1982) before beginning college.

After graduating from Yale in 1984 with a BA in History, she continued working as a puppet and mask maker on various television and film productions including Labyrinth (1986), The Tale of the Bunny Picnic (1986), and one 1987 episode of Saturday Night Live. She attended the Fashion Institute of Technology and earned a degree in textile design in 1987. She sold her own original fabric designs and continued to work on specific projects at Jim Henson’s Creature Shop in London and New York, creating puppets for The Storyteller and Mother Goose Stories, and serving as Art Director for The Song of the Cloud Forest, an episode of The Jim Henson Hour.

In 1988, Cheryl Henson designed and built Hugo the Hornet, the first mascot of the Charlotte Hornets NBA basketball team. Hugo was made in the team’s distinctive colors of teal and purple, chosen by fashion designer and North Carolina native, Alexander Julian.

From 1992 to 2000, Henson was a Vice President of The Jim Henson Company, specifically charged with coordinating between the company and the Children’s Television Workshop (now Sesame Workshop), the producers of Sesame Street. During this time she focused on helping to bring puppets and puppeteer training to the international productions of the series. Since 2003, when the Henson siblings repurchased The Jim Henson Company, she has worked with the company’s New York branch, where the Sesame Street puppets continue to be designed and fabricated.

== Advocacy for puppetry arts ==
Since 1992, Cheryl Henson has been the President of The Jim Henson Foundation, which supports innovative contemporary American puppet theater. Each year, she oversees the foundation’s competitive granting process, which to date has awarded over 1000 grants, including grants to over 360 American puppet artists and over 100 grants to theaters in New York City to present puppetry. The Foundation also offers two international travel grants per year and a residency in collaboration with The Eugene O’Neill Theater Center.

From 1992 to 2000, she was also the executive producer of the biennial Henson International Festival of Puppet Theater. According to the company website, "These five festivals presented 136 different productions from 31 countries in 24 theaters throughout New York City." In 1993, the festival won both an Obie Award and a Drama Desk Award In 1994, Andrew Solomon described the festivals in The New York Times as "more imaginative than Broadway, and greater in its impact than the movies."

Cheryl Henson co-created the Puppets on Film festival at the Brooklyn Academy of Music, which ran annually from 2011 to 2014.

From 2017-2021, she sponsored a clinical research study at the Yale Child Study Center, looking at how kids with autism relate to puppets. The study was supervised by Dr. Katarznya Chawarska, and utilized puppet videos made with the Jim Henson Foundation. The academic paper was published on August 4, 2021, in Autism Research, the journal of The International Society for Autism Research.

She is on the board of the Center for Puppetry Arts in Atlanta, home to the Worlds of Puppetry Museum, which showcases the largest collection of Jim Henson’s puppets and the most substantial collection of global puppetry on display in the United States. She is also a board member of The Jim Henson Legacy, a non-profit dedicated to celebrating Jim Henson’s contributions to the worlds of puppetry, television, motion pictures, special effects and media technology; and was on the board of the Museum of the Moving Image in New York from 2018-2021, to support their permanent and touring Jim Henson Exhibitions.

== Publications ==
The Muppets Make Puppets, by Cheryl Henson and The Muppet Workshop, an activity and crafting book featuring how to make puppets out of everyday objects, give the puppets character and perform shows. Workman, 1995

It’s Not Easy Being Green and Other Things to Consider, a collection of quotes, anecdotes, and insights from Jim Henson, his characters, and those who knew him best, edited and introduced by Cheryl Henson. Hyperion, 2005 In 2006, Cheryl accepted the Quill Award for this book on behalf of her father, stating "The Quills are chosen by readers so it is especially thrilling to accept this award on my father's behalf. To see people continue to connect and respond to my father's ideas about imagination, joy and wonder is a tribute to the ongoing legacy of work he created." [5]

Cheryl has also written introductions to Puppetry: How to do it by Mervyn Millar and Out of the Shadows: The Henson Festivals and their Impact on Contemporary Puppet Theater by Leslee Asch; and a forward to The Dark Crystal: The Ultimate Visual History by Caseen Gaines

== Personal life ==
She has been married to Edwin A. Finn Jr. since May 26, 2001. They have two children.
