= Julie on Sesame Street =

Variety special

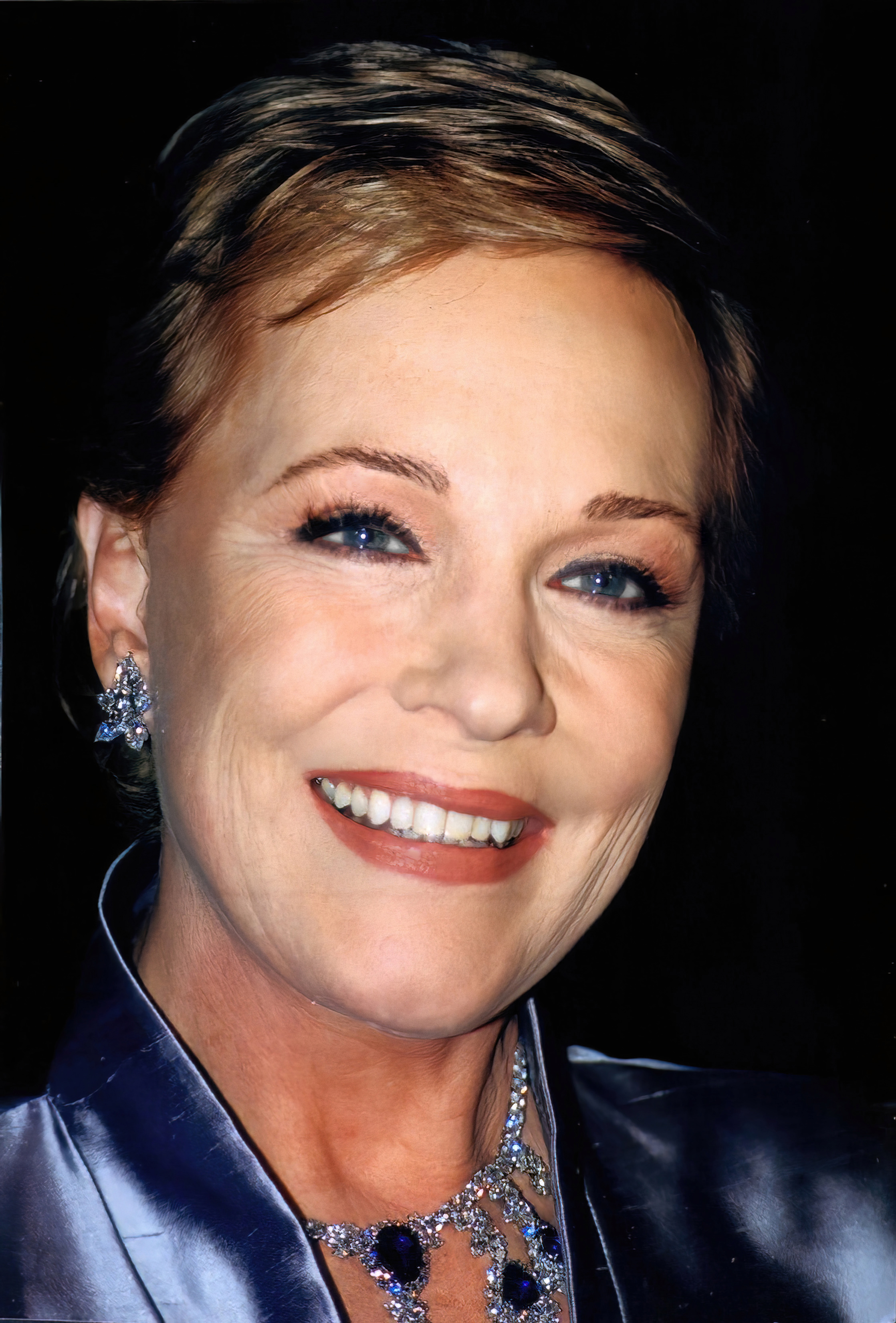
- Andrews in 2001
- Written by: Jon Stone, Marty Farrell
- Directed by: Dwight Hemion
- Starring: Julie Andrews; Perry Como; Jim Henson's Muppets (performed by Jim Henson, Frank Oz, Caroll Spinney, Jerry Nelson, Richard Hunt, Caroly Wilcox, Kermit Love, Jane Henson)
- Composers: Jack Parnell; Derek Scott (Musical Associate)
- Countries of origin: United States; United Kingdom

Production
- Executive producer: Blake Edwards
- Producers: Gary Smith and Dwight Hemion
- Production locations: ATV Elstree, Borehamwood, England
- Running time: 60 mins.
- Production companies: ATV; ITC Entertainment

Original release
- Network: ABC (US); ITV (UK)
- Release: November 23, 1973

Julie on Sesame Street is a variety special that was broadcast in the United States on ABC on November 23, 1973 at 9 PM ET / PT. Sponsored on ABC by technology/telecommunications conglomerate GTE, the special starred Julie Andrews and Perry Como, and they were joined by several of Jim Henson's Muppets from the PBS children's series, Sesame Street. No human members of the Sesame Street cast appeared in this special. Andrews and "special guest star" Como interacted with the Muppet characters (including Kermit the Frog, Big Bird, Cookie Monster, Oscar the Grouch, Grover, and Bert and Ernie), sharing comedic banter and singing songs such as "Being Green" and "Picture a World" on the Sesame Street "neighborhood" set.

The special was produced by ATV and ITC at ATV Elstree in the United Kingdom (and not at Sesame Street's then-usual New York City studios), It was televised in that country on ITV on July 10, 1974 at 8pm in most regions. The special was the first Muppets-related program to be produced with ATV and ITC, who would both co-produce the highly successful The Muppet Show three years later.

== Muppet cast ==
- Jim Henson as Ernie, Kermit the Frog
- Frank Oz as Bert, Cookie Monster, Grover
- Jerry Nelson as Biff, Frazzle, Mr. Snuffleupagus
- Caroll Spinney as Big Bird, Oscar the Grouch
- Richard Hunt
- Kermit Love
- Jane Henson
