= Jane Henson =

American puppeteer (1934–2013)

- Born: Jane Ann Nebel; June 16, 1934; Queens, New York, U.S.
- Died: April 2, 2013 (aged 78); Greenwich, Connecticut, U.S.
- Education: University of Maryland, College Park
- Occupation: Puppeteer
- Years active: 1955–1993
- Board member of: Jim Henson Foundation; The Jim Henson Legacy; American Center for Children's Television
- Spouse: Jim Henson (m. 1959; sep. 1986)
- Children: 5 (Lisa, Cheryl, John, Heather, & Brian)

Jane Nebel Henson (née Ann Nebel; June 16, 1934 – April 2, 2013) was an American artist, puppeteer, philanthropist, and co-founder of Muppets, Inc. with her husband Jim Henson. Jane's contributions were integral to the success of The Muppets and Jim's other work.

== Early life ==
Jane Ann Nebel was born the youngest of three children in St. Albans, Queens, New York to Winifred Johnson Nebel and astrologer Adalbert Nebel (known professionally as Dal Lee). She majored in fine arts education at the University of Maryland, College Park. Nebel met Jim Henson, two years her junior, in a puppetry course in the fall of 1954.

Nebel was a member of Alpha Xi Delta sorority. She lived in the sorority house during her time at the University of Maryland.

== Career ==
After meeting him at the University of Maryland, Jane Nebel agreed to work alongside Jim Henson on a regular slot entitled Inga's Angle for WRC-TV's Afternoon. Their success led them to begin their own slot entitled Sam and Friends, where Nebel collaborated with Henson in performing Muppets and devising several of the show's technical innovations, including the use of television monitors to watch their performances in real time. When, in the late 1950s, Henson took a year off from Sam and Friends to travel in Europe, Nebel ran the show with the help of a University of Maryland classmate, Bob Payne.

Nebel and Henson did not begin a romantic relationship until Jim returned from Europe in 1958. They were married on May 28, 1959 at Jane's family home in Salisbury, Maryland. Lisa Henson, the first of their five children, was born a year later.

When she quit full-time puppeteering in the early 1960s to raise their children, Jim hired Jerry Juhl and Frank Oz to replace her. She helped Oz learn how to lip sync, and continued to perform non-speaking muppets on Sesame Street from time to time through at least the 1980s. She was also responsible for the hiring of puppeteer Steve Whitmire in 1978 after he gave her an impromptu audition in an airport restaurant. Whitmire took over performing Kermit the Frog and Ernie of Sesame Street after Jim Henson's death in 1990.

In 1990, the Henson Company forged an agreement with Disney to present a live stage show, Here Come the Muppets, at Disney-MGM Studios. Jane was the main developer in the training of performers and profile creation for the walkaround versions of the Muppets: Kermit the Frog, Miss Piggy, Fozzie Bear, Gonzo the Great, Bean Bunny, as well as five members of the Electric Mayhem.

Towards the end of her life, Jane Henson conceived the idea of a stylized puppet show based on the Gospel accounts of the birth of Jesus. Together with a small group of collaborators, she created a live theatre piece featuring tabletop manger figure puppets built by Jim Henson's Creature Shop. Jane Henson's Nativity Story premiered at the 2010 Orlando Puppet Festival. After Jane Henson's death in 2013, vignettes from the stage show were used in the CBS television special A New York Christmas to Remember, narrated by Regis Philbin. A tribute to Henson from family and friends was part of the national broadcast.

== Personal life ==
Jane and Jim Henson married in 1959; together they had five children: Lisa (born 1960), Cheryl (born 1961), Brian (born 1963), John (1965–2014), and Heather Henson (born 1970). Although Jane and Jim had separated in 1986, they remained close until his death in 1990. In 1992, she established The Jim Henson Legacy to preserve and perpetuate the work of her husband. She served on the boards of the Jim Henson Foundation and the American Center for Children's Television.

== Illness and death ==
On March 20, 2013, her daughter Cheryl Henson revealed that her mother had cancer and was paralyzed; she asked fans to keep Jane in their prayers. Henson died at the family home in Greenwich, Connecticut, on April 2, 2013, at the age of 78. She was buried at Saint Bridge Cemetery, Cornwall, Connecticut. The 2014 film Muppets Most Wanted was dedicated to her and to fellow Muppet performer Jerry Nelson who died in 2012.
