= Heather Henson =

American puppeteer (born 1970)

- Born: Heather Beth Henson; December 19, 1970 (age 55); New York City, U.S.
- Education: Rhode Island School of Design
- Occupations: Producer and Puppeteer
- Years active: 1971–present
- Board member of: Green Feather Foundation, Jane Henson Foundation, The Jim Henson Company,Jim Henson Legacy
- Parent(s): Jim Henson; Jane Henson
- Relatives: Lisa Henson (sister); Cheryl Henson (sister); Brian Henson (brother); John Henson (brother)
- Website: www.ibexpuppetry.com

Heather Beth Henson (born December 19, 1970) is an American producer, puppet artist, and philanthropist whose work promotes healing for the planet and bringing people into harmony with nature. Henson is the daughter of Jim Henson. She is founder and President of Green Feather Foundation and serves on The Jim Henson Company and The Jim Henson Legacy Boards of Directors. She is also a former Trustee of the International Crane Foundation, the Jim Henson Foundation, and the Eugene O'Neill Theater Center in Connecticut.

== Early life ==
Henson was born on December 19, 1970, in New York City, the youngest child of Jim (1936–1990) and Jane Henson (1934–2013). She has four siblings: Lisa Henson (born 1960), Cheryl Henson (born 1961), Brian Henson (born 1963), and John Henson (1965–2014).

== Career ==
Henson is a graduate of George School and the Rhode Island School of Design, and attended the California Institute of the Arts. Her on-screen appearances include the Number Three Ball Film and The Muppets Take Manhattan, The Storyteller episode "Hans My Hedgehog," the role of Prince Kermit in The Frog Prince, as well as Frank Oz's film Little Shop of Horrors.

Henson is a producer, puppet artist, and philanthropist whose work promotes healing for the planet and bringing people into harmony with nature through immersive experiences and the fine art of puppetry. As founder of Green Feather Foundation, Heather produces her own theatrical works– Ajijaak on Turtle Island, Harmonious Migrations, Celebration of Flight, Panther and Crane, Endangered Species Parade, Lhamo Trung Trung, Echo Trace– as well as supporting the work of other independent artists through the Handmade Puppet Dreams film series (currently available to stream on Amazon, Roku, and Kanopy) and through the Puppet Slam Network, a grassroots community of presenters of short form puppetry for adults. Green Feather Foundation umbrellas the work previously done by IBEX Puppetry. In addition, Heather organizes workshops and retreats through a program called “Nature Makers,” fostering a community of professional artists using puppetry to deepen their personal connection with nature.

In honoring her parents’ legacies, Heather serves as President of The Jane Henson Foundation, Chair of the Jim Henson Legacy, and Shareholder of the Jim Henson Company.

Beyond Henson's work with Green Feather Foundation and IBEX Puppetry, Henson produced a 2025 tour of Fraggle Rock Live and previously The Orlando Puppet Festival,
