= Lisa Henson =

American film producer (born 1960)

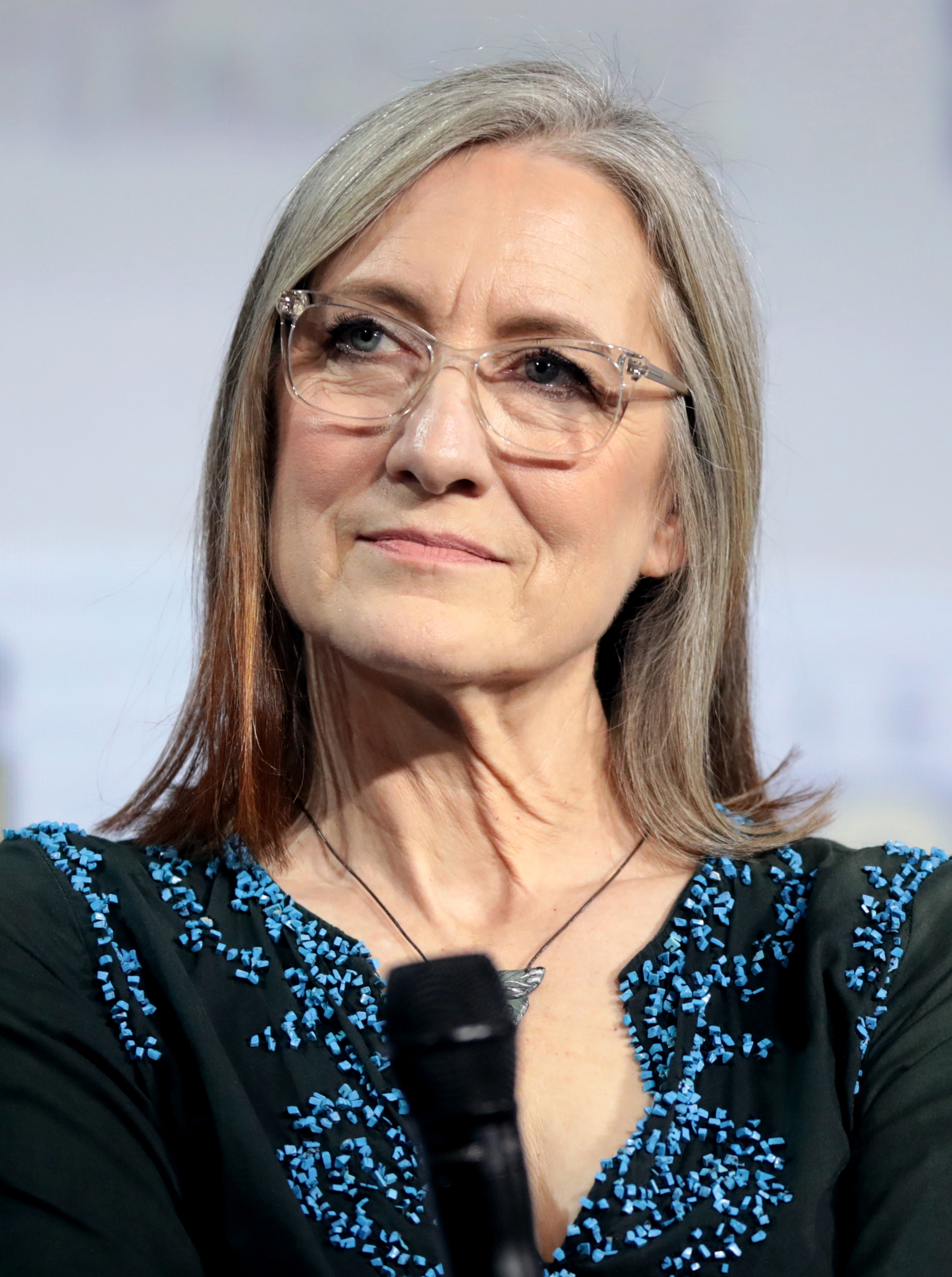
- Henson at the 2019 San Diego Comic-Con
- Born: Lisa Marie Henson; May 9, 1960 (age 65); Washington, D.C., U.S.
- Occupation: Producer
- Years active: 1965–present
- Spouse: Dave Pressler
- Children: 2
- Parents: Jim Henson (father); Jane Henson (mother)
- Relatives: Cheryl Henson (sister); Brian Henson (brother); John Henson (brother); Heather Henson (sister)

Lisa Marie Henson (born May 9, 1960) is an American television and film producer who has been involved in television shows such as Sid the Science Kid. She is the CEO of The Jim Henson Company, founded by her parents Jim and Jane Henson.

== Early life and education ==
Henson was born on May 9, 1960, in Washington, D.C. and grew up in Greenwich, Connecticut and Westchester County, New York. She attended Byram Hills High School. She is the daughter and the oldest child of puppeteers Jane (née Nebel; 1934–2013) and Jim Henson (1936–1990), and she has four younger siblings: Cheryl (born 1961), Brian (born 1963), John (1965–2014), and Heather Henson (born 1970).

Henson has an undergraduate degree from Harvard University where she studied ancient Greek and concentrated in Folklore and Mythology.

== Career ==
In 1982, while at Harvard, Henson was elected president of The Harvard Lampoon, the first woman to serve in this position. In comedy, she was known for visual representation of humor, art parody.

Starting in 1983 Henson worked at Warner Bros. where she was first an executive assistant, and by 1991 she was promoted to executive vice president.

In 1993, Henson was named president of worldwide production at Columbia Pictures. Prior to this her work was on production of movies such as Lethal Weapon and the Batman films. She was replaced in the role in 1996 by Amy Pascal.

She has also served on the Harvard Board of Overseers.

As of 2024, Henson is the CEO of The Jim Henson Company. In 2012 she joined other companies who sought to avoid connections with Chick-fil-A due to their opposition to gay marriage.

== Filmography ==
=== Shorts ===
Year	Title	Role
1965	Run, Run	Child
2005	Because of the Wonderful Things It Does: The Legacy of Oz	Herself
2006	The Making of MirrorMask	Herself

=== Television ===
Year	Title	Role	Notes
2004	Kingdom Hospital	Producer	11 episodes
2006	Laugh Pad	Executive producer	Failed pilot
2006	Late Night Buffet with Augie and Del	Executive producer	Failed pilot
2007	The Skrumps	Executive producer	9 episodes
2008	Frances	Executive producer	6 episodes
2008–2013	Sid the Science Kid	Executive producer	68 episodes
2009–2020	Dinosaur Train	Executive producer	89 episodes
2010–2011	Me and My Monsters	Executive producer	26 episodes
2010	Jim Henson's Pajanimals	Executive producer	11 episodes
2012–2013	Doozers	Executive producer	52 episodes
2013	Teeny Tiny Dogs	Executive producer	Failed pilot
2013–2014	Good Morning Today	Executive producer	20 episodes
2013–2016	No, You Shut Up!	Executive producer	58 episodes
2014	Jim Henson's Creature Shop Challenge	Executive producer	8 episodes
2015	Lily the Unicorn	Executive producer	Failed pilot
2015	Good Morning America	Herself	1 episode
2016–2017	Word Party	Executive producer	14 episodes
2016–2018	Splash and Bubbles	Executive producer	
2016	Dot.	Executive producer	
2017	Julie's Greenroom	Executive producer	
2019	The Dark Crystal: Age of Resistance	Executive producer	10 episodes
2021–2023	Harriet the Spy	Executive producer	20 episodes

=== Film ===
Year	Title	Role	Notes
1998	Zero Effect	Producer	
2000	Ivans Xtc	Margaret Mead, Executive producer	
2000	The Weight of Water	Executive producer	
2002	High Crimes	Executive producer	
2003	Good Boy!	Producer	
2004	Five Children and It	Producer	
2005	MirrorMask	Executive producer	
2005	The Muppets' Wizard of Oz	Executive producer	Television movie
2008	Unstable Fables: 3 Pigs and a Baby	Producer	direct-to-video movie
2008	The Kreutzer Sonata	Executive producer	
2008	Unstable Fables: Tortoise vs. Hare	Producer	direct-to-video movie
2008	Unstable Fables: The Goldilocks and the 3 Bears Show	Producer	direct-to-video movie
2012	Sid the Science Kid: The Movie	Executive producer	television movie
2014	Alexander and the Terrible, Horrible, No Good, Very Bad Day	Producer	
2015	Turkey Hollow	Executive producer	television movie
2017	The Star	Executive producer	
2018	The Happytime Murders	Executive producer	
2022	Pinocchio	Producer	
2023	The Portable Door	Executive producer	
2023	The Monk and the Gun	Executive producer	
2024	Jim Henson Idea Man	Producer	
2025	Alexander and the Terrible, Horrible, No Good, Very Bad Road Trip	Producer	

=== Music Videos ===
- Ben Folds Five's "Do It Anyway": Executive producer with Chris Hardwick
