= Jim Henson =

American puppeteer (1936–1990)

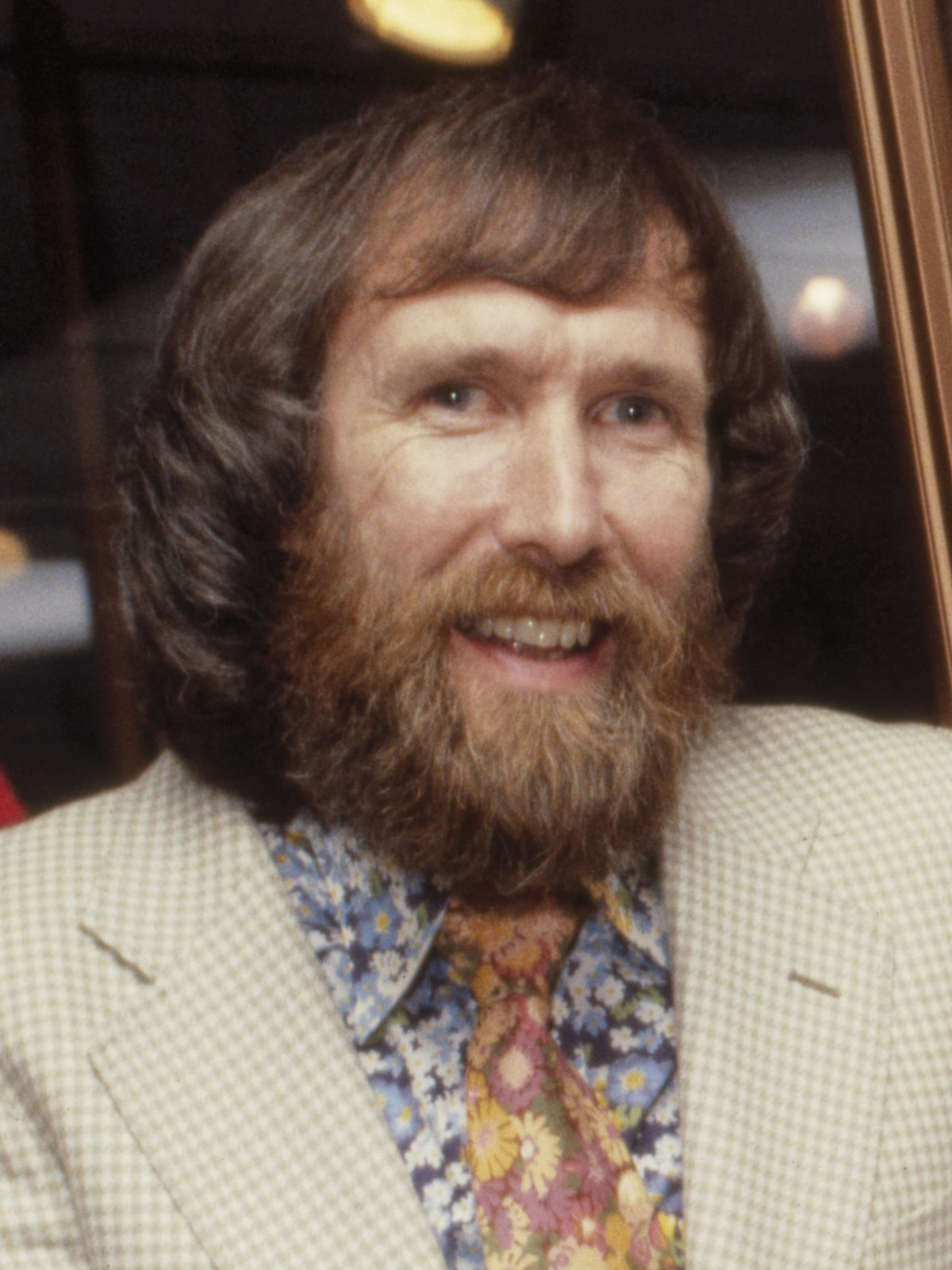
- Henson in 1979
- Born: James Maury Henson; September 24, 1936; Greenville, Mississippi, U.S.
- Died: May 16, 1990 (aged 53); New York City, U.S.
- Cause of death: Toxic shock syndrome caused by a Group A streptococcal infection
- Education: University of Maryland (BS)
- Occupations: Puppeteer; filmmaker
- Years active: 1954–1990
- Known for: Creator of the Muppets
- Board member of: Jim Henson Foundation; The Jim Henson Company (1958–1990); Jim Henson's Creature Shop (1979–1990)
- Spouse: Jane Henson (m. 1959; sep. 1986)
- Children: Lisa; Cheryl; Brian; John; Heather
- Awards: Courage Conscience Award; Emmy Award; Disney Legend; Inkpot Award
- Website: henson.com

James Maury Henson (September 24, 1936 – May 16, 1990) was an American puppeteer and filmmaker who achieved worldwide notability as the creator of the Muppets. Henson was also well known for creating Fraggle Rock (1983–1987) and directing The Dark Crystal (1982) and Labyrinth (1986), as well as creating the Muppets for Sesame Street (1969–present).

Born in Greenville, Mississippi, and raised in both Leland, Mississippi, and University Park, Maryland, Henson began developing puppets in high school. He created Sam and Friends (1955–1961), a short-form comedy television program on WRC-TV, while he was a freshman at the University of Maryland, College Park, in collaboration with fellow student Jane Nebel. Henson and Nebel co-founded Muppets, Inc. – now The Jim Henson Company – in 1958, and married less than a year later in 1959. Henson graduated from the University of Maryland with a degree in home economics.

In 1969, Henson joined the children's television program Sesame Street, where he helped to develop Muppet characters for the series. He and his creative team also appeared on the first season of the sketch comedy show Saturday Night Live (1975–present). He produced the sketch comedy television series The Muppet Show (1976–1981) during this period. Henson revolutionized the way puppetry is captured and presented in video media, and he won fame for his characters – particularly Kermit the Frog, Rowlf the Dog, and the characters on Sesame Street. During the later years of his life, he founded the Jim Henson Foundation and Jim Henson's Creature Shop. He won the Emmy Award twice for his involvement in The Storyteller (1987–1988) and The Jim Henson Hour (1989).

Henson died in New York City from toxic shock syndrome caused by Streptococcus pyogenes. At the time of his death, he was in negotiations to sell his company to The Walt Disney Company, but talks fell through after his death. He was posthumously awarded a star on the Hollywood Walk of Fame in 1991, and was named a Disney Legend in 2011.

== Early life ==
James Maury Henson was born on September 24, 1936, in Greenville, Mississippi, the younger of two children of Betty Marcella (née Brown, 1904–1972) and Paul Ransom Henson Sr. (1904–1994), an agronomist for the United States Department of Agriculture. His elder brother, Paul, Jr, died in a car crash on April 15, 1956. Jim was raised as a Christian Scientist and spent his early childhood in nearby Leland, Mississippi, before moving with his family to University Park, Maryland, near Washington, D.C., in the late 1940s and later to Bethesda, Maryland. He remembered the arrival of the family's first television as "the biggest event of his adolescence", being heavily influenced by radio ventriloquist Edgar Bergen and the early television puppets of Burr Tillstrom on Kukla, Fran and Ollie and Bil and Cora Baird. He remained a Christian Scientist at least into his twenties, when he taught Sunday school, but he wrote to a Christian Science church in the early 1970s to inform them that he was no longer a practicing member.

=== Education ===
Henson attended a variety of grade schools in his youth, including Hyattsville High School until it was closed in 1951. He completed his high school career at the newly opened Northwestern High School, where he joined the puppetry club.

Henson enrolled at the University of Maryland, College Park, the following fall as a studio arts major, thinking that he might become a commercial artist. As a freshman at the university, Jim took a newly offered puppetry class mostly populated with seniors, including his future wife Jane Nebel. He was graduated in 1960 with a Bachelor of Science degree in home economics.

== Career ==
=== Early career: 1954–1961 ===
Henson began working at WTOP-TV (now WUSA-TV) in the late spring of 1954, at age 17, hired to "manipulate marionettes" on a Saturday morning children's show called The Junior Morning Show, until the show was cancelled only three weeks later. This first break into the television industry was short-lived, but his talent landed him and his puppets an opportunity to continue working at WTOP-TV, lip syncing on Roy Meachum's Saturday show.

Henson's employment at WTOP-TV lasted only until August, when Saturday was also cancelled. Meachum then referred Jim to the local NBC-affiliate station WRC-TV, where Henson continued performing his puppets with Jane's help. The two were eventually offered a nightly segment for which they created Sam and Friends, a three-to-five-minute puppet show that afforded Henson much more freedom to develop his own creative work. The characters on Sam and Friends were forerunners of the Muppets, and the show included a prototype of Henson's most famous character, Kermit. He remained at WRC until Sam and Friends aired its last episode on December 15, 1961.

In the show, Henson began experimenting with techniques that changed the way in which puppetry was used on television, foregoing the convention of pointing the camera at a stationary puppet theatre proscenium and instead using the image created by the TV camera and lens to dynamically engage with his characters. He believed that television puppets needed to have "life and sensitivity". Rather than carving wooden puppets Henson built characters from softer, flexible materials like foam rubber; his first iteration of Kermit was made from a halved table tennis ball and fabric from an old coat belonging to his mother, with denim from a pair of jeans forming the sleeve for the puppeteer's arm.

Though Henson told people that "Muppet" was a portmanteau of "marionette" and "puppet", many early Muppets were actually hand puppets, rod puppets, or some combination of the two. Direct control over the puppet's mouth, in combination with the softer construction materials, allowed the puppeteer to express a wider range of emotions and to more accurately move the puppet's mouth along with the character's dialogue or while lip syncing to music. Commenting on his puppet design philosophy, Henson said,

"A lot of people build very stiff puppets—you can barely move the things—and you can get very little expression out of a character that you can barely move. Your hand has a lot of flexibility to it, and what you want to do is to build a puppet that can reflect all that flexibility."

Sam and Friends was a financial success, but Henson began to have doubts about going into a career performing with puppets once he graduated. He spent six weeks in Europe during the summer of 1958, originally with the intent to study painting, but was surprised to learn that puppets were considered just as serious an art form as painting or sculpture. After returning to the United States he and Jane made their partnership official, creating Muppets, Inc. in November of that same year, then marrying each other in 1959.

=== Television and Muppets: 1961–1969 ===
Henson spent much of the next two decades working in commercials, talk shows, and children's projects before realizing his dream of the Muppets as "entertainment for everybody". The popularity of his work on Sam and Friends in the late 1950s led to a series of guest appearances on network talk and variety shows. He appeared as a guest on many shows, including The Steve Allen Show, The Jack Paar Program, and The Ed Sullivan Show. (Sullivan introduced him as "Jim Newsom and his Puppets" on September 11, 1966.) These television broadcasts greatly increased his exposure, leading to hundreds of commercial appearances by Henson characters throughout the 1960s.

Among the most popular of Henson's commercials was a series for the local Wilkins Coffee company in Washington, D.C., created for a campaign managed by advertising manager Helen Ver Standig. Most of the Wilkins advertisements followed a similar formula: two Muppets, in this case named Wilkins and Wontkins (usually both voiced by Henson), would appear. Wilkins would extol the product while Wontkins would express his hatred for it, prompting physical retaliation from Wilkins; Wontkins might be shot with a cannon, struck in the head with a hammer or baseball bat, or have a pie thrown in his face. The Jim Henson Company has posted a short selection of them. Henson later explained, "Till then, advertising agencies believed that the hard sell was the only way to get their message over on television. We took a very different approach. We tried to sell things by making people laugh."

The first seven-second commercials for Wilkins were an immediate hit and were later remade for other local coffee companies throughout the United States, such as Community Coffee, Red Diamond Coffee, La Touraine Coffee, Nash's Coffee, and Jomar Instant coffee. The characters were so successful in selling coffee that soon other companies began seeking them to promote their products, such as bakeries like Merita Breads, service station chains such as Standard Oil of Ohio and the downstream assets of Marathon Oil, and beverage bottlers such as Faygo. Over 300 "Wilkins and Wontkins" commercials were made. The ads were primarily produced in black and white, but some color examples also exist.

Henson sold the rights to Wilkins and Wontkins to the Wilkins Company, who allowed marketing executive John T. Brady to sell the rights to some toymakers and film studios. However, in July 1992 Brady was sued by Jim Henson Productions for unfair competition in addition to copyright and trademark infringement. The Henson company claimed that Brady was incorrectly using Henson's name and likeness in their attempts to license the characters.

In 1963, Henson and his wife moved to New York City where the newly formed Muppets, Inc. resided for some time. Jane quit performing to raise their children, and Henson hired writer Jerry Juhl in 1961 and puppet performer Frank Oz in 1963 to replace her. Henson credited them both with developing much of the humor and character of his Muppets. Henson and Oz developed a close friendship and a performing partnership that lasted until Henson's death; their teamwork is particularly evident in their portrayals of Bert and Ernie, Kermit and Miss Piggy, and Kermit and Fozzie Bear. In New York City, Henson formed a partnership with Bernie Brillstein, who managed Henson's career until the puppeteer's death. In the years that followed, more performers joined Henson's team, including Jerry Nelson, Richard Hunt, Dave Goelz, Steve Whitmire, Fran Brill, and Kevin Clash. In 1964, he and his family moved to Greenwich, Connecticut, where they lived until 1971, when they moved to Bedford, New York.

3 commercials for McGarry's Sausages in 1964 featuring Kermit the Frog and Mack, following the typical snappy, wordplay-based violent format of a Wilkins & Wontkins commercial

Henson's talk show appearances culminated when he devised Rowlf, a piano-playing anthropomorphic dog that became the first Muppet to make regular appearances on The Jimmy Dean Show. Henson was so grateful for this break that he offered Jimmy Dean a 40-percent interest in his production company, but Dean declined, stating that Henson deserved all the rewards for his own work, a decision of conscience that Dean never regretted. From 1963 to 1966, Henson began exploring filmmaking and produced a series of experimental films. His nine-minute experimental film Time Piece was nominated for an Academy Award for Best Live Action Short Film in 1965. He produced The Cube in 1969. Around this time, he wrote the first drafts of a live-action movie script with Jerry Juhl which became Tale of Sand. The script remained in the Henson Company archives until it was adapted in the 2012 graphic novel Jim Henson's Tale of Sand.

During this time, Henson continued to work with various companies who sought out his Muppets for advertising purposes. Among his clients were Wilson Meats, Royal Crown Cola, Claussen's Bread, La Choy, and Frito-Lay, which featured an early version of his character Cookie Monster to promote their Munchos line of potato snacks. Like the Wilkins Coffee ads of the late 1950s and early 1960s, the formula stayed fairly similar. For instance, one of the Claussen's commercials featured Kermit the Frog dangling from a window while a character named Mack asks him if he brought a loaf of the company's bread; when Kermit says he did not, Mack closes the window on Kermit's fingers and causes him to fall, suggesting he "drop down" to the grocery store to buy a loaf.

=== Sesame Street: 1969 ===
In 1969, television producer Joan Ganz Cooney and her staff at the Children's Television Workshop were impressed by the quality and creativity of the Henson-led team, so they asked Henson and staff to work full-time on Sesame Street, a children's program for public television that premiered on National Educational Television on November 10, 1969. Part of the show was set aside for a series of funny, colorful puppet characters living on Sesame Street, including Grover, Cookie Monster, Bert and Ernie, Oscar the Grouch, and Big Bird. Henson performed the characters of Ernie, game-show host Guy Smiley, and Kermit, who often appeared as a roving television news reporter.

Henson's Muppets initially appeared separately from the realistic segments on the Street, but the show was revamped to integrate the two segments, placing much greater emphasis on Henson's work. Cooney frequently praised Henson's work, and PBS called him "the spark that ignited our fledgling broadcast service." The success of Sesame Street also allowed him to stop producing commercials, and he said that "it was a pleasure to get out of that world".

Henson was also involved in producing various shows and animation inserts during the first two seasons. He produced a series of counting films for the numbers 1 through 10 which always ended with a baker (voiced by Henson) falling down the stairs while carrying the featured number of desserts. He also worked on a variety of inserts for the numbers 2 through 12, including the films "Dollhouse"; "Number Three Ball Film"; the stop-motions "King of Eight" and "Queen of Six"; the cut-out animation "Eleven Cheer"; and the film "Nobody Counts To 10." He also directed the original "C Is for Cookie" and Tales from Muppetland, a short series of TV movie specials that were comic retellings of classic fairy tales aimed at a young audience and hosted by Kermit the Frog. The series included Hey, Cinderella!, The Frog Prince, and The Muppet Musicians of Bremen.

=== Expansion of audience: 1970–1978 ===
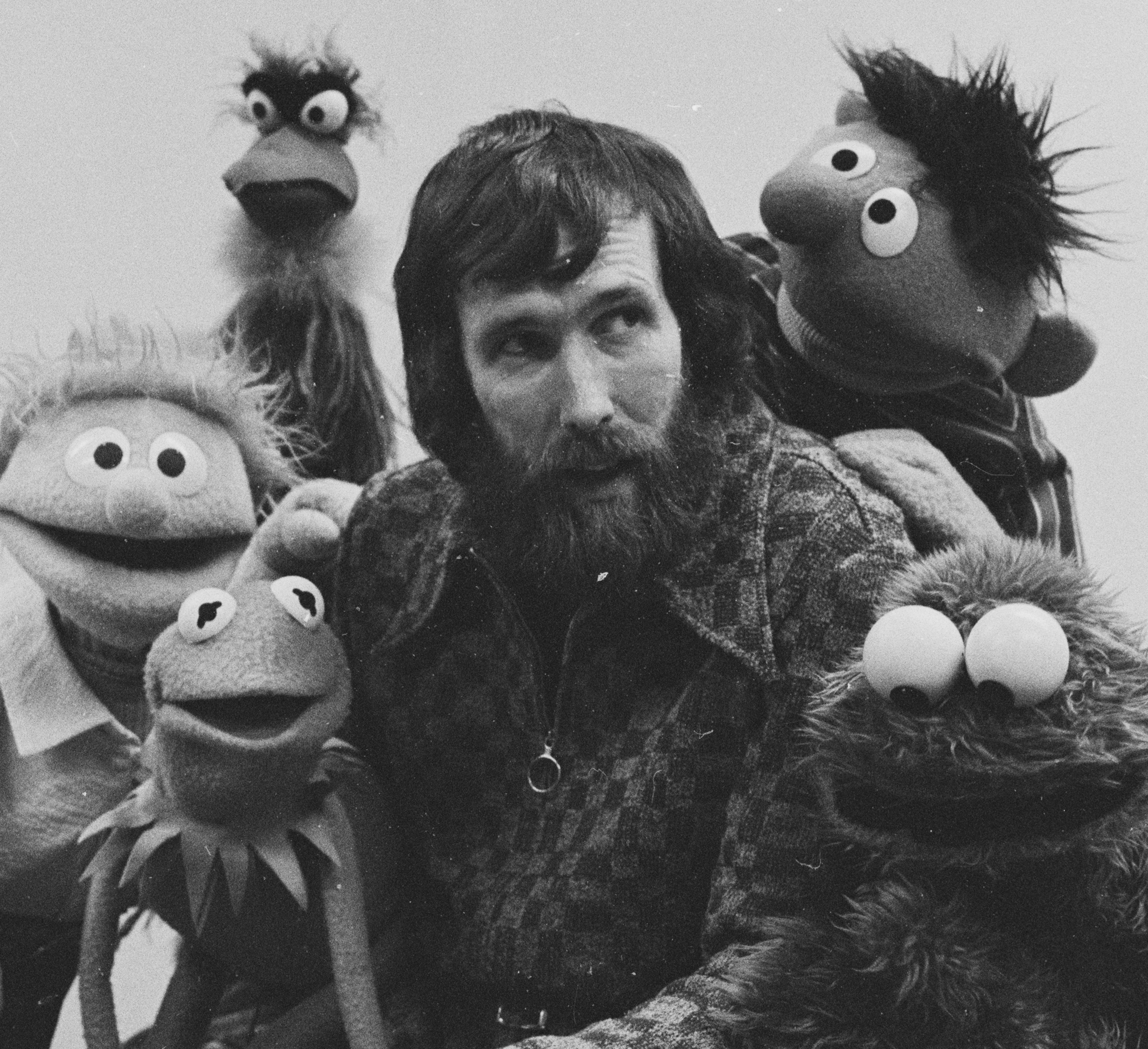
Henson in 1971

Henson, Oz, and his team were concerned that the company was becoming typecast solely as purveyors of children's entertainment, so they targeted an adult audience with a series of sketches on the first season of the late-night live television variety show Saturday Night Live. Eleven Land of Gorch sketches were aired between October 1975 and January 1976 on NBC, with four additional appearances in March, April, May, and September 1976. Henson liked Lorne Michaels' work and wanted to be a part of it, but he ultimately concluded that "what we were trying to do and what his writers could write for it never gelled". The SNL writers were not comfortable writing for the characters, and they frequently disparaged Henson's creations. Michael O'Donoghue quipped, "I won't write for felt."

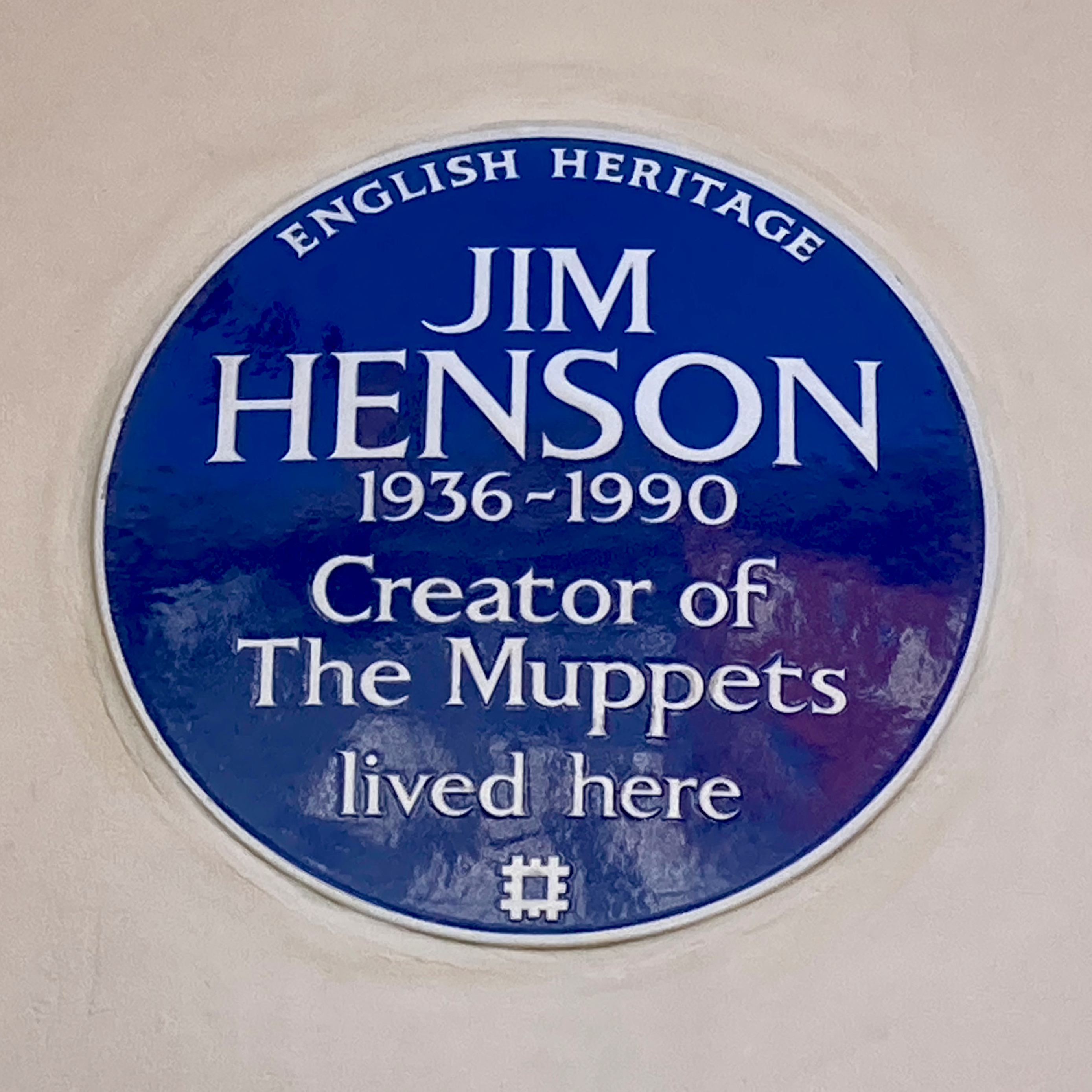
English Heritage blue plaque at Henson's former home in North London

Henson began developing a Broadway show and a weekly television series both featuring the Muppets. The American networks rejected the series in 1976, believing that Muppets would appeal only to a child audience. Then, Henson pitched the show to British impresario Lew Grade to finance the show. The show would be shot in the United Kingdom and syndicated worldwide. That same year, he scrapped plans for his Broadway show and moved his creative team to England, where The Muppet Show began taping at ATV Elstree Studios in Hertfordshire. The show featured Kermit as host, with a variety of prominent characters, notably Miss Piggy, Gonzo the Great, and Fozzie Bear, in addition to its large cast of supporting characters such as the Muppet musicians Dr. Teeth and the Electric Mayhem with their chaotic drummer Animal. Henson's teammates sometimes compared his role to that of Kermit: a shy, gentle boss with "a whim of steel" who ran things like "an explosion in a mattress factory." Caroll Spinney, who performed as Big Bird, remembered that Henson would never say he did not like something. "He would just go 'Hmm.' ... And if he liked it, he would say, 'Lovely!'" Henson recognized Kermit as an alter ego, though he thought that Kermit was bolder than he; Henson once said of the character: "He can say things I hold back."

=== Transition to the big screen: 1979–1986 ===
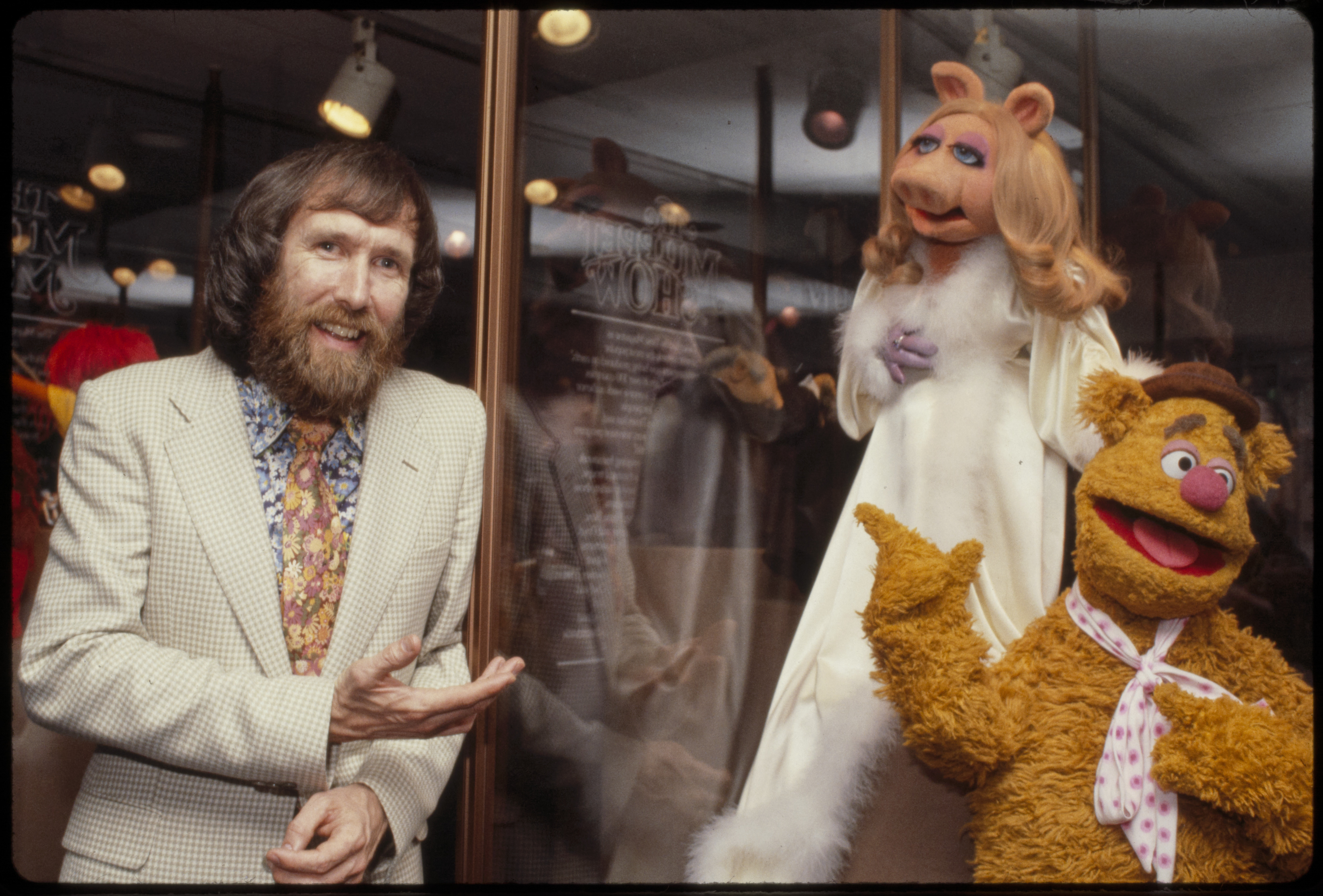
Henson with Miss Piggy and Fozzie Bear in 1979

The Muppets appeared in their first theatrical feature film The Muppet Movie in 1979. It was both a critical and financial success; it made $65.2 million domestically and was the 61st highest-grossing film at the time. Henson's idol Edgar Bergen died at age 75 during production of the film, and Henson dedicated it to his memory. Henson as Kermit sang "Rainbow Connection", and it hit number 25 on the Billboard Hot 100 and was nominated for an Academy Award for Best Original Song. The Henson-directed The Great Muppet Caper (1981) followed, and Henson decided to end The Muppet Show to concentrate on making films, though the Muppet characters continued to appear in television movies and specials.

Henson also aided others in their work. During development on The Empire Strikes Back (1980), George Lucas asked him to aid make-up artist Stuart Freeborn in the creation and articulation of Yoda. Lucas had also wanted Henson to puppeteer the character, but Henson instead suggested Frank Oz for the role; Oz performed the role and continued in the subsequent Star Wars films. Lucas lobbied unsuccessfully to have Oz nominated for an Academy Award for Best Supporting Actor.

In 1982, Henson founded the Jim Henson Foundation to promote and develop the art of puppetry in the United States. Around that time, he began creating darker and more realistic fantasy films that did not feature the Muppets and displayed "a growing, brooding interest in mortality." He co-directed The Dark Crystal (1982) with Oz, "trying to go toward a sense of realism—toward a reality of creatures that are actually alive". To provide a visual style distinct from the Muppets, the puppets in The Dark Crystal were based on conceptual artwork by Brian Froud, and it was a critical success, winning several industry awards including the Saturn Award for Best Fantasy Film and the Grand Prize Winner at the Avoriaz Fantastic Film Festival. The film was less financially successful in theaters, but later claimed an enormous following and revenue when it was introduced on VHS for home entertainment. Also in 1982, Henson co-founded Henson International Television with Peter Orton and Sophie Turner Laing as his partners. The company was a distribution company for children's, teens' and family television.

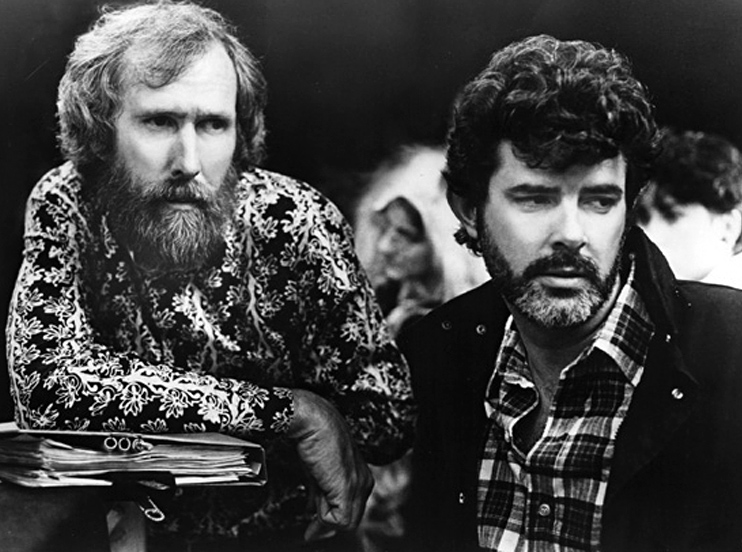
Henson and executive producer George Lucas working on Labyrinth in 1986

Henson worked with Oz again on The Muppets Take Manhattan (1984), this time with Oz as sole director. The film grossed $25.5 million domestically of a budget of only around $8 million, and ranked as one of the top 40 films of 1984.

Labyrinth (1986) was a fantasy that Henson directed by himself, but—despite some positive reviews; The New York Times called it "a fabulous film"—it was a commercial disappointment. This demoralized Henson; his son Brian Henson described it as "the closest I've seen him to turning in on himself and getting quite depressed." The film later became a cult classic.

In 1984 Henson traveled to Moscow, where he made a film about Sergei Obraztsov. Henson also donated four dolls to the puppeteer to replenish the Moscow Museum of Obraztsov Puppets: Fraggle, Skeksi, Bugard, and Robin the Frog. Of the show's guests, the Henson Archivist points out that Jim Henson placed a special importance on meeting Obraztsov: "As a teenager learning to make puppets, Jim checked out some books from the public library for instruction – one was Obraztsov’s 1950 book, My Profession"

=== Last years: 1987–1990 ===
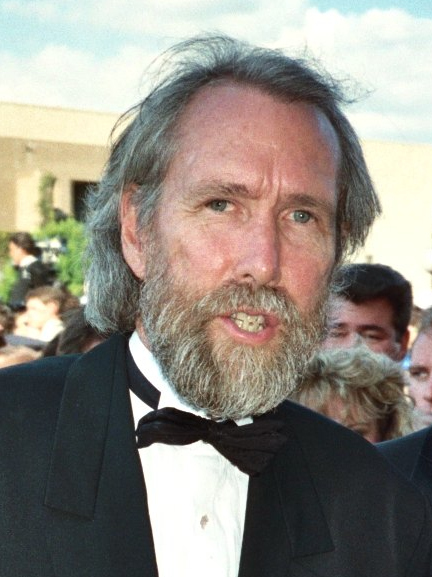
Henson at the 1989 Emmy Awards

Henson continued creating children's television, such as Fraggle Rock and the animated Muppet Babies. He also continued to address darker, more mature themes with the folklore and mythology-oriented show The Storyteller (1988), which won an Emmy for Outstanding Children's Program. The next year, he returned to television with The Jim Henson Hour, which mixed lighthearted Muppet fare with more risqué material. It was critically well-received and won him another Emmy for Outstanding Directing in a Variety or Music Program, but it was canceled after 12 episodes due to poor ratings. Henson blamed its failure on NBC's constant rescheduling.

In late 1989, Henson entered into negotiations to sell his company and characters (excluding those from Sesame Street) to The Walt Disney Company for almost $150 million, hoping that he would "be able to spend a lot more of my time on the creative side of things" with Disney handling business matters. By 1990, he had completed production on the television special The Muppets at Walt Disney World and the Disney-MGM Studios attraction Muppet*Vision 3D and he was developing film ideas and a television series entitled Muppet High.

== Personal life ==
Henson and fellow puppeteer Jane Nebel were married on May 28, 1959, in a small ceremony at Jane's family home. They had five children: Lisa (born 1960), Cheryl (born 1961), Brian (born 1963), John (1965–2014), and Heather Henson (born 1970). Henson and his wife legally separated in 1986, but never divorced. While he had a few short relationships with other women, he remained close to Jane for the rest of his life. Jane said that Henson was so involved with his work that he had very little time to spend with her or their children. His children began working with Muppets at an early age, partly because "one of the best ways of being around [Jim] was to work with him", according to Cheryl.

Henson was a strong supporter of the civil rights movement.

Henson took an interest in the Seth Material by Jane Roberts, a series of mystical-philosophical documents which Roberts claimed to have received via supernatural means. Brian Jay Jones reports in Jim Henson, the Biography, "...on July 30 [1974], [Henson] drove to Elmira, New York, to pay his respects to Roberts and her husband. 'I find this inspired material very beautiful,' Jim said of the Seth Material. 'It puts everything into a harmonious totality that I just love.'"

== Illness and death ==
Henson had his final television appearance with Kermit the Frog on The Arsenio Hall Show in Los Angeles, California, on May 4, 1990. He privately disclosed to his publicist shortly afterwards that he was tired and had a sore throat, but he believed that it was a minor illness. He then traveled to Ahoskie, North Carolina, with his daughter Cheryl to visit his father and stepmother on May 12. The following day, May 13, they returned to their home in New York City and, due to his ill health, Henson cancelled a Muppet recording session that had been set for another following day, May 14.

Henson was having trouble breathing when he woke up at around 2:00 a.m. EDT on May 15, and he began coughing up blood. He suggested to his wife that he might be dying, but he did not want to take time out of his schedule to visit a hospital, feeling that his illness would resolve on its own. Two hours later, Henson agreed to be taken by taxi to the emergency room at NewYork-Presbyterian Hospital in Manhattan. Shortly after admission, he stopped breathing and was rushed into the intensive care unit. X-ray images of his chest revealed multiple abscesses in both of his lungs as a result of a previous streptococcal pharyngitis he had apparently had for the past few days. Henson was placed on a ventilator but quickly deteriorated over the next several hours despite increasingly aggressive treatment with multiple antibiotics. Although the medicine killed off most of the infection, it had already weakened many of Henson's organs, and he died at 1:21 a.m. the following day at age 53.

David Gelmont, the hospital's intensive care unit director, initially announced that Henson had died from Streptococcus pneumoniae, a bacterium that causes bacterial pneumonia. However, by May 29, Gelmont had reclassified the cause of Henson's death as organ dysfunction resulting from streptococcal toxic shock syndrome caused by Streptococcus pyogenes. Gelmont noted Henson might have been saved had he gone to the hospital just a few hours sooner.

Medicine reporter Lawrence D. Altman of The New York Times also stated that Henson's death "may have shocked many Americans who believed that bacterial infections no longer could kill with such swiftness." A lack of common familiarity with fast-developing bacterial infections, combined with the recent AIDS-related deaths of several prominent men (including Rock Hudson, Liberace, and Roy Cohn), led to a false but widespread rumor that Henson had died of AIDS. This rumor was swiftly and directly refuted by Gelmont. Frank Oz believed the stress of negotiating with Disney contributed to Henson's death, stating in a 2021 interview: "The Disney deal is probably what killed Jim. It made him sick." His remains were cremated, and in 1992, his ashes were scattered near Taos, New Mexico.

=== Memorials ===
Disney artists Joe Lanzisero and Tim Kirk drew a tribute of Mickey Mouse consoling Kermit the Frog, which appeared in the Summer 1990 issue of WD Eye.

News of Henson's death spread quickly and admirers of his work responded from around the world with tributes and condolences. Many of Henson's co-stars and directors from Sesame Street, the Muppets, and other works also shared their thoughts on his death. Numerous outlets covered his death alongside that of Sammy Davis Jr, who died the same day. On May 21, 1990, Henson's public memorial service was conducted in Manhattan at the Cathedral of St. John the Divine. Another was conducted on July 2, at St Paul's Cathedral in London. At the former, Harry Belafonte sang "Turn the World Around", a song that he had debuted on The Muppet Show, as each member of the congregation waved a brightly colored foam butterfly attached to a puppet performer's rod. Later, Big Bird (performed by Caroll Spinney) walked onto the stage and sang Kermit's signature song "Bein' Green" while fighting back tears. Dave Goelz, Frank Oz, Kevin Clash, Steve Whitmire, Jerry Nelson, and Richard Hunt sang a medley of Henson's favorite songs in their characters' voices, ending with a performance of "Just One Person" while performing their Muppets.

In accordance with Henson's wishes, no one in attendance wore black, and the Dirty Dozen Brass Band finished the service by performing "When the Saints Go Marching In". The funeral was described by Life as "an epic and almost unbearably moving event".

== Legacy ==
The Jim Henson Company and the Jim Henson Foundation continued after his death, producing new series and specials. Jim Henson's Creature Shop also continues to create characters and special effects for both Henson-related and outside projects. Steve Whitmire, who had joined the Muppets cast in 1978, began performing Kermit the Frog six months after Henson's death. He was dismissed from the cast in October 2016, and Matt Vogel succeeded him in the role of Kermit.

The Children's Television Workshop was renamed Sesame Workshop, which retained the Sesame Street characters in 2001. On February 17, 2004, the Muppets and the Bear in the Big Blue House properties were sold to Disney.

One of Henson's last projects was the attraction Muppet*Vision 3D, which opened at Disney's Hollywood Studios on May 16, 1991, exactly one year after his death. Muppet*Vision 3D at Disney's Hollywood Studios closed to guests on June 8, 2025. However, Disney cast members were given the opportunity to view the show a final time on June 10.

The Jim Henson Company retains the Creature Shop as well as the rest of its film and television library, including Fraggle Rock, Farscape, The Dark Crystal, and Labyrinth. Brian Jay Jones wrote the book Jim Henson: The Biography. It was released on what would have been Henson's 77th birthday, September 24, 2013.

The moving-image collection of Jim Henson, which contains the film work of Jim Henson and The Jim Henson Company, is held at the Academy Film Archive.

In 2019, the YouTube channel Defunctland released a six-part miniseries on the life and legacy of Jim Henson.

A biopic film based on Henson's life, known as Muppet Man, has been in development at Walt Disney Pictures and The Jim Henson Company since 2010. The original screenplay written by Christopher Weekes topped the Hollywood Blacklist in 2009. In April 2021, it was reported that Michael Mitnick was hired to rewrite the screenplay, previously written by Aaron and Jordan Kandell. Lisa Henson will serve as producer.

In March 2022, it was announced that Ron Howard planned to direct a documentary on Henson's life, with Brian Grazer's Imagine Entertainment collaborating with Disney Original Documentary to produce it. The project was reported to have "the full participation and cooperation of the Henson family". In April 2024, it was announced the documentary was titled Jim Henson Idea Man. It began streaming on Disney+ on May 31, 2024.

In 2024, Henson was portrayed by Nicholas Braun in the biographical dramedy Saturday Night, which chronicles the production of the first episode of Saturday Night Live.

Henson's characters are currently performed by the following puppeteers: Matt Vogel (Kermit the Frog), Peter Linz (Ernie, Link Hogthrob), Eric Jacobson (Guy Smiley, The Newsman), Dave Goelz (Waldorf) and Bill Barretta (Rowlf the Dog, The Swedish Chef, Dr. Teeth, Mahna Mahna).

The Dark Crystal served as an inspiration to Matt Braly's Amphibia; Vogel (credited as Kermit the Frog) makes a guest appearance on the latter as Crumpet the Frog in the season 2 episode, "Swamp and Sensibility". Kermit himself appeared in two promotional web videos for the series.

Pixar's Chief Creative Officer, Pete Docter, cites Henson and The Muppets as profound influences on his career as a filmmaker.

=== Tributes ===
- In 1971, the University of Maryland's National Residence Hall Honorary chapter was founded as the Jim Henson Chapter. The UMD NRHH Chapter is still the Jim Henson Chapter to this day. The Michelle Smith Performing Arts Library created an exhibit from 2019 to 2020 highlighting Jim Henson's time at the university.
- Henson is honored both as himself and as Kermit the Frog on the Hollywood Walk of Fame. Only three other people have received this honor: Walt Disney as both himself and Mickey Mouse; Mel Blanc as both himself and Bugs Bunny; and Mike Myers as both himself and Shrek. Henson was posthumously inducted into the Walk of Fame in 1991.
- Henson received an Honorary Doctorate of Letters from Fordham University, Rose Hill Campus, Bronx, New York (June 1982)
- Henson was inducted into the Television Hall of Fame in 1987.
- Henson received the Golden Plate Award of the American Academy of Achievement in 1987.
- The theater and Visual and Performing Arts Academy at his alma mater, Northwestern High School, in Hyattsville, Maryland, is named in his honor.
- Teenage Mutant Ninja Turtles II: The Secret of the Ooze and The Muppet Christmas Carol are both dedicated to his memory.
- Henson featured in The American Adventure in Epcot at the Walt Disney World Resort.
- The Jim Henson Exhibit, located in Leland, Mississippi, features an assortment of original Muppet characters, official certificates from the Mississippi Legislature honoring Henson and his characters, and a statue of Kermit in the middle of the stream behind the museum.
- The 1990 television special The Muppets Celebrate Jim Henson allowed the Muppets themselves to pay tribute to Henson. The special featured interviews with Steven Spielberg and others.
- Tom Smith's Henson tribute song, "A Boy and His Frog", won the Pegasus Award for Best Filk Song in 1991.
- The classes of 1994, 1998, and 1999 at the University of Maryland, College Park, Henson's alma mater, commissioned a life-size statue of Henson and Kermit the Frog, which was dedicated on September 24, 2003, on what would have been Henson's 67th birthday. The statue cost $217,000 and is displayed outside Maryland's student union. In 2006, the University of Maryland introduced 50 statues of its school mascot, Testudo the Terrapin, with various designs chosen by different sponsoring groups. Among them was Kertle, a statue designed to look like Kermit the Frog by Washington, DC–based artist Elizabeth Baldwin.
- In 2003, Jim Henson was honored at the annual Norsk Høstfest in Minot, North Dakota.
- Our Atlan, Thibaut Berland, and Damien Ferrie wrote, directed, and animated a 3D tribute to Henson entitled Over Time that was shown as part of the 2005 Electronic Theater at SIGGRAPH.
- On September 28, 2005, the U.S. Postal Service issued a sheet of commemorative stamps honoring Henson and the Muppets.
- On August 9, 2011, Jim Henson posthumously received the Disney Legends Award. Two of his characters, Kermit the Frog and Rowlf the Dog, performed "Rainbow Connection" in his honor.
- On September 24, 2011, which what would have been Henson's 75th birthday, Mississippi town Leland renamed a local bridge to "The Rainbow Connection" to honor Henson and his work. He was also honored with a Google doodle to commemorate his 75th birthday; the Google logo had six Muppets that were clickable using the "hand" buttons.
- The Center for Puppetry Arts in Atlanta opened a gallery of Muppets exhibits within the Worlds of Puppetry exhibition at the Center in November 2015, a greatly scaled-down version of what was announced in 2007 to have been a wing honoring Henson.
- In 2015, a new genus and species of Cretaceous-aged fossil frog from Canada, Hensonbatrachus kermiti, was named in honor of Henson and Kermit the Frog.
- In July 2016, Hyattsville, Maryland installed a memorial to Jim Henson in the city's Magruder Park, featuring a large planter embossed with images of characters from Sam & Friends and benches inscribed with quotes from Henson.
- The Jim Henson Exhibition: Imagination Unlimited, an exhibition organized by the Museum of the Moving Image showcasing over 300 artifacts from Henson's career, premiered at the Museum of Pop Culture in Seattle before opening at its permanent home in New York City in 2017. A traveling version of the exhibition, featuring over 100 objects and 25 historic puppets, has been hosted by several cultural institutions across the U.S. including Skirball Cultural Center in Los Angeles (June–September 2018), Albuquerque Museum (November 2019 – April 2020), Durham Museum in Omaha (October 2020 – January 2021), The Henry Ford museum in Dearborn (June–September 2021), the Contemporary Jewish Museum in San Francisco (May–August 2022), and the Grand Rapids Art Museum in Michigan (October 2022 – January 2023). The traveling exhibition's final stop will be the Maryland Center for History and Culture in Baltimore (May–December 2023).
- In 2018, the American Banjo Museum inducted Henson into its hall of fame, for his positive portrayal of the banjo in his shows and in The Muppet Movie.
- In 2020, the 1979 song "Rainbow Connection" from The Muppet Movie (performed by Henson as Kermit) was deemed "culturally, historically, or aesthetically significant" by the Library of Congress and selected for preservation in the National Recording Registry.
- On September 7, 2021, a blue plaque was unveiled at Jim Henson's former Hampstead home, 50 Downshire Hill NW3 to honor his artistic creativity. Henson purchased his London home in 1979 after ITV commissioned the Muppet series, filmed at Elstree Studios.
- An area outside Studio 6B at NBC's Rockefeller Center headquarters in New York City includes a set of pipes that Henson and his team of puppeteers had painted while waiting to perform on The Jack Paar Show in 1964. While the artwork has been preserved over time – Henson showed it to Gene Shalit on Today in 1980 and Paar took David Letterman over to see it during an appearance on Late Night which taped across the hall – it was not until Jimmy Fallon, host of the studio's current tenant The Tonight Show, brought it up that NBC officially made the pipes part of its studio tour. Frank Oz attended the ribbon-cutting for the exhibit in 2010.

== Filmography ==
=== Film ===
| Year | Film | Director | Producer | Screenwriter | Actor | Role | Notes |
|---|---|---|---|---|---|---|---|
| 1965 | Time Piece | Yes | Yes | Yes | Yes | Man | Short film |
| 1979 | The Muppet Movie | No | Yes | No | Yes | Kermit the Frog; Rowlf the Dog; Dr. Teeth; Waldorf; Swedish Chef; Additional Muppets | |
| 1981 | The Great Muppet Caper | Yes | No | No | Yes | Kermit the Frog; Rowlf the Dog; Dr. Teeth; Waldorf; Swedish Chef; The Newsman; Additional Muppets | |
| 1982 | The Dark Crystal | Yes | Yes | Story | Yes | Jen skekZok/The Ritual Master skekSo/The Emperor | Puppeteering only Co-directed with Frank Oz |
| 1984 | The Muppets Take Manhattan | No | Executive | No | Yes | Kermit the Frog; Rowlf the Dog; Dr. Teeth; Waldorf; Swedish Chef; The Newsman; Ernie; Additional Muppets | |
| 1985 | Into the Night | No | No | No | Yes | Man on the phone | Cameo |
| 1985 | Sesame Street Presents: Follow That Bird | No | No | No | Yes | Kermit the Frog; Ernie | |
| 1986 | Labyrinth | Yes | No | Story | No | | |
| 1990 | Teenage Mutant Ninja Turtles | No | No | No | No | | Turtle costume effects |
| 1990 | The Witches | No | Yes | No | No | | |
| 1991 | Muppet*Vision 3D | Yes | No | No | Yes | Kermit the Frog; Waldorf; The Swedish Chef | 3D film attraction at Disney's Hollywood Studios, posthumous release |

=== Television ===
| Year | Film | Director | Producer | Screenwriter | Actor | Role | Notes |
|---|---|---|---|---|---|---|---|
| 1954 | The Junior Morning Show | No | No | No | Yes | Pierre the French Rat; Additional Muppets | aired on WTOP-TV |
| 1954 | Saturday | No | No | No | Yes | Additional Muppets | aired on WTOP-TV |
| 1955–1956 | Afternoon with Inga | No | No | No | Yes | Additional Muppets | aired on WRC-TV |
| 1955 | In Our Town | No | No | No | Yes | Sam; Kermit; Yorick; Additional Muppets | aired on WRC-TV |
| 1955–1961 | Sam and Friends | Yes | No | Yes | Yes | Sam; Harry the Hipster; Kermit; Professor Madcliffe; Omar; Yorick; Pierre the French Rat; Additional Muppets | aired on WRC-TV |
| 1956 | Footlight Theater | No | No | No | Yes | Sam; Additional Muppets | aired on WRC-TV |
| 1962 | Tales of the Tinkerdee | No | Yes | Yes | Yes | Kermit the Frog; Additional Muppets | Unaired; Pilot available on YouTube |
| 1963–1966 | The Jimmy Dean Show | No | No | No | Yes | Rowlf the Dog | |
| 1969 | The Cube | Yes | Yes | Yes | No | | |
| 1969 | The Wizard of Id test pilot | No | Yes | No | Yes | Additional Muppets | Pilot available on YouTube |
| 1969 | Hey, Cinderella! | Yes | No | No | Yes | Kermit the Frog; King Goshposh; Additional Muppets | |
| 1969–1990 | Sesame Street | Yes | No | Yes | Yes | Ernie; Kermit the Frog; Guy Smiley; Bip Bippadotta; Harvey Monster; Additional Muppets | |
| 1970 | The Muppets on Puppets | No | Executive | No | Yes | Himself; Rowlf the Dog; Kermit; Additional Muppets | Filmed in 1968 |
| 1971 | The Frog Prince | Yes | Yes | No | Yes | Kermit the Frog; Garth the Frog; King Rupert the Second; Additional Muppets | Puppeteer/Voice |
| 1972 | The Muppet Musicians of Bremen | Yes | Yes | No | Yes | Kermit the Frog; Mean Floyd; Rat | Puppeteer/Voice |
| 1973 | Julie on Sesame Street | No | No | No | Yes | Kermit the Frog; Ernie | |
| 1974 | Out to Lunch | No | No | No | Yes | Kermit the Frog; Ernie; Guy Smiley | |
| 1974 | The Muppets Valentine Show | Yes | Executive | No | Yes | Wally; Kermit the Frog; Rowlf the Dog; Ernie; Additional Muppets | Puppeteer/Voice |
| 1975 | The Muppet Show: Sex and Violence | No | Yes | Yes | Yes | Nigel; Scudge; Snerf; George Washington; Dr. Teeth; Waldorf; The Swedish Chef; Kermit the Frog; Rowlf the Dog; Shirley (puppetry); Green Heap; Ernie; Woman; Rex Additional Muppets | Puppeteer/Voice |
| 1976–1981 | The Muppet Show | No | Yes | Yes | Yes | Kermit the Frog; Rowlf the Dog; Dr. Teeth; Waldorf; The Swedish Chef; Link Hogthrob; The Newsman; Additional Muppets | |
| 1977 | Emmet Otter's Jug-Band Christmas | Yes | Yes | No | Yes | Kermit the Frog; Harvey Beaver; Howard Snake; Mayor Harrison Fox | Television film |
| 1978 | Christmas Eve on Sesame Street | No | No | No | Yes | Kermit the Frog; Ernie | Television film |
| 1979 | John Denver and the Muppets: A Christmas Together | No | No | No | Yes | Kermit the Frog; Rowlf the Dog; Dr. Teeth; The Swedish Chef; Waldorf; Link Hogthrob | Television special |
| 1981 | The Muppets Go to the Movies | No | Yes | No | Yes | Kermit the Frog; Rowlf the Dog; Link Higthrob; The Swedish Chef; Waldorf; Gladiator Pig | Television special |
| 1983–1987 | Fraggle Rock | Yes | Executive | Yes | Yes | Cantus the Minstrel; Convincing John | |
| 1983 | Rocky Mountain Holiday | Yes | Yes | No | Yes | Kermit the Frog; Rowlf the Dog; Waldorf; Zeke | Television film and Album |
| 1983 | Big Bird in China | No | No | No | Yes | Ernie | Television film |
| 1983 | Don't Eat the Pictures | No | No | No | Yes | Ernie | Television film |
| 1985 | Little Muppet Monsters | No | No | No | Yes | Kermit the Frog (live-action puppet only); Dr. Teeth | |
| 1986 | The Muppets: A Celebration of 30 Years | No | Executive | No | Yes | Kermit the Frog; Rowlf the Dog; Dr. Teeth; Waldorf; The Swedish Chef; Link Hogthrob; Ernie; Harry the Hipster; The Newsman; Additional Muppets | Television film |
| 1986 | The Tale of the Bunny Picnic | Yes | Yes | No | Yes | The Dog | Television film |
| 1986 | The Christmas Toy | No | Yes | No | Yes | Jack-in-the-Box; Kermit the Frog | Television film |
| 1987–1988 | The Storyteller | Yes | Executive | No | No | | |
| 1987 | Fraggle Rock: The Animated Series | No | Executive | No | No | | |
| 1987 | A Muppet Family Christmas | No | Executive | No | Yes | Himself (cameo); Kermit the Frog; Rowlf the Dog; Dr. Teeth; Waldorf; Swedish Chef; The Newsman; Ernie; Guy Smiley; Baby Kermit; Baby Rowlf; Additional Muppets | Television film |
| 1988 | Sing-Along, Dance-Along, Do-Along | No | Executive | No | Yes | Rowlf the Dog; Penguins; Kermit the Frog | Entry in the Play-Along Video series |
| 1988 | Sesame Street, Special | No | No | No | Yes | Ernie; Kermit the Frog; Additional Muppets | Television special |
| 1984–1991 | Muppet Babies | No | Executive | No | No | | |
| 1989 | Sesame Street... 20 Years & Still Counting | No | Executive | No | Yes | Ernie; Kermit the Frog; Additional Muppets | Television film |
| 1989 | The Jim Henson Hour | Yes | Executive | No | Yes | Himself; Kermit the Frog; Rowlf the Dog; Additional Muppets | |
| 1990 | The Earth Day Special | Yes | No | No | Yes | Kermit the Frog | segment: "Kermit the Frog" |
| 1990 | The Muppets at Walt Disney World | No | Executive | No | Yes | Kermit the Frog; Rowlf the Dog; Dr. Teeth; Waldorf; Link Hogthrob; The Swedish Chef | Television special |
| 1990 | The Muppets Celebrate Jim Henson | No | No | No | Yes | Himself | Television Special, posthumous release |

=== Video games ===
| Year | Title | Role | Notes |
|---|---|---|---|
| 1988 | Oscar's Letter Party | Kermit the Frog | |
| 1988 | Let's Learn to Play Together | Ernie | |
| 1991 | Sesame Street Numbers | Ernie; Kermit the Frog | Voice only, Posthumous release |
| 1991 | Sesame Street Letters | Ernie; Kermit the Frog | Voice only, Posthumous release |

== Bibliography ==
- Finch, Christopher (1993). Jim Henson: The Works – The Art, the Magic, the Imagination. New York: Random House. ISBN 0-679-41203-4.
- Jones, Brian Jay (2013). Jim Henson: The Biography. New York: Ballantine Books. ISBN 978-0-345-52611-3.
- Henson, Jim. "The Red Book". JimHenson.Com. The Jim Henson Company.
- Finch, Christopher (1981). Of Muppets and Men: The Making of The Muppet Show. New York: Muppet Press/Alfred A. Knopf. ISBN 0-394-52085-8.

| Preceded by None | Performer of Kermit the Frog; 1955–1990 | Succeeded by Steve Whitmire |
| Preceded by None | Performer of Ernie; 1969–1990 | Succeeded by Steve Whitmire |
| Preceded by None | Performer of Captain Vegetable; 1982 | Succeeded by Richard Hunt |
| Preceded by None | Performer of The Muppet Newsman; 1976–1989 | Succeeded by Jerry Nelson |
| Preceded by None | Performer of Link Hogthrob; 1977–1990 | Succeeded by Steve Whitmire |
| Preceded by None | Performer of Rowlf the Dog; 1962–1990 | Succeeded by Bill Barretta |
| Preceded by None | Performer of The Swedish Chef; 1975–1990 | Succeeded by David Rudman |
| Preceded by None | Performer of Dr. Teeth; 1975–1990 | Succeeded by John Kennedy |
| Preceded by None | Performer of Mahna Mahna; 1969–1986 | Succeeded by Bill Barretta |
| Preceded by None | Performer of Waldorf; 1975–1990 | Succeeded by Dave Goelz |
| Preceded by None | Performer of Guy Smiley; 1969–1990 | Succeeded by Don Reardon |
