= Ghosts (video game) =

Upcoming video game

- Developers: Cerulean Games; Ascendent Animation
- Publishers: Visible Games; Limited Run Games
- Director: Jed Shepherd
- Programmer: RedVonix
- Writer: Jed Shepherd
- Composer: Christopher Escalante
- Platforms: Nintendo Switch; PlayStation 4; PlayStation 5; Windows; Xbox One
- Genres: Interactive movie Horror
- Mode: Single-player

Ghosts is an upcoming interactive movie horror video game written and directed by Jed Shepherd, and developed and published by Cerulean Games, Ascendent Animation, Visible Games, and Limited Run Games. The game is planned for release on Nintendo Switch, PlayStation 4, PlayStation 5, Windows and Xbox One. It will feature creatures designed by online horror artist Trevor Henderson (who also created Siren Head and Cartoon Cat), illustrations by Graham Humphreys and production by Jim Henson's Creature Shop.

The game revolves around the player, in the role of a television producer behind the fictitious, titular live-action show (stylized in all caps) – a property now purchased by FrighTV, after it initially received lower ratings. The show features the main cast composed entirely of ghost hunters (played by Haley Bishop, Radina Drandova, Jemma Moore, Caroline Ward and Emma Louise Webb). There is also the fictitious urban legend of "the Long Lady" – anyone who would take a look at her would be inflicted with sudden death.

== Gameplay ==
The player serves as a TV producer, who is managing a live supernatural-themed TV show. All taking place in real time, the player must look after the show's hosts, as well as managing for the aforementioned show, select footage to edit and include advertisements and film trailers to show to the audience, send out people to help, and interact with neighbours – all while they are trying not to die in the process. The game features a time-based restriction, which will only allow it to function at 10 p.m. in the player's local time. Turning the game off before finishing it will immediately kill the cast of the show.

== Development ==
Jed Shepherd came up with the idea for the game during the COVID-19 pandemic lockdown whilst he was looking for horror games to "freak [him] out". The game features the cast of the 2020 film Host, which Shepherd was a writer and executive producer on. The idea to only allow the game to play at 10 p.m. came from the game Boktai: The Sun Is in Your Hand, which features a solar panel - requiring players to go into the sun to battle vampires. A crowdfunding campaign was launched on Kickstarter on April 8, 2021, and ended on May 8, 2021, having raised £183,245 from 2,231 backers.

On June 26, 2021, actors Alice Lowe and Scroobius Pip joined the game's cast. A short video was later posted, featuring the two as the unnamed presenters of the fictitious television series.

During the Limited Run Games LRG3 announcement, the official trailer for the game was shown with a release date of 2025.

On August 30, 2024, at the PAX West convention in Seattle, Washington, a playable demo was shown for the first time.

In January 2026 the game was renamed FrighTV Presents Ghosts after Cerulean Games acquired it and released a new trailer.
