= Emily DeCola =

American performer and designer

Emily DeCola is an American performer and designer, known primarily for her work with puppets.

She has received several grants in the past, including the Jim Henson Foundation Project Grant, the 2004 UNIMA Grant for International Study in Puppetry, as well as a YES Foundation Fellowship. She was praised for her mask design in Peter Hall's staging of Animal Farm, as well as her puppet work in David Zellnik's Serendib. DeCola has contributed to eHow.com, and currently works at The Puppet Kitchen, based in New York's East Village.
