= Brian Henson =

American filmmaker and puppeteer (born 1963)

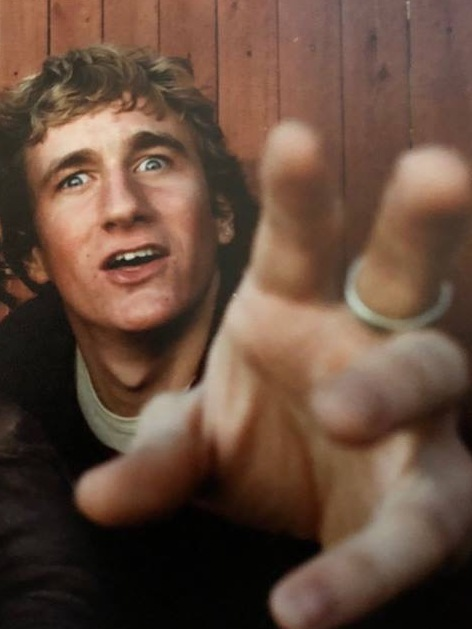
- Henson in 1982
- Born: November 3, 1963 (age 63); New York City, U.S.
- Occupations: Puppeteer; filmmaker
- Years active: 1979–present
- Spouses: Ellis Flyte (m. 1990; div. 2002) Mia Sara (m. 2010)
- Children: 1
- Parents: Jim Henson; Jane Henson
- Relatives: Lisa Henson (sister); Cheryl Henson (sister); John Henson (brother); Heather Henson (sister)

Brian David Henson (born November 3, 1963) is an American puppeteer, filmmaker, and the chairman of The Jim Henson Company. He is the son of puppeteers Jim and Jane Henson.

== Early life ==
Henson was born on November 3, 1963 in New York City, the third child of Jane Henson (née Nebel; 1934–2013) and Jim Henson (1936–1990). He has four siblings: Lisa (born 1960), Cheryl (born 1961), John (1965–2014) and Heather Henson (born 1970).

As a child, Henson appeared in some of the filmed segments that his father produced for the PBS children's series Sesame Street.

As a teenager, he built the first Muppet penguin puppet for the opening "Lullaby of Broadway" segment of a Season 3 episode of The Muppet Show. During his summer break from high school at the age of 17, Henson assisted in the production of The Great Muppet Caper (1981); skilled in the use of marionette puppets, he helped create and operate a special rigging device that allowed the Muppets to appear to ride bicycles. Several years later, after performing marionette work in The Muppets Take Manhattan (1984) in the scene in which rats cook food in a diner, he specialized in managing complicated special effects.

== Career ==
=== Film ===
Henson performed Jack Pumpkinhead in Return to Oz (1985), operated special effects for Santa Claus: The Movie (1985) and was a principal performer for the Audrey II puppet in Little Shop of Horrors (1986), controlling mouth movement while others performed the lips and vines. He also performed the voice of Hoggle, one of the main characters in his father's film Labyrinth (1986), and the dog in both versions of The Storyteller (1988 and 1990).

In 1992, Henson directed The Muppet Christmas Carol and directed the next film in the franchise, Muppet Treasure Island, in 1996. He performed the role of Dr. Phil van Neuter, the Muppet mad scientist character he performed on Muppets Tonight, in Muppets from Space (1999). In 2018, he directed and produced The Happytime Murders, a puppet crime-comedy film for adult audiences.

=== Television ===
Henson was the executive producer for several television series: Dinosaurs (1991–94), Aliens in the Family (1996), Bear in the Big Blue House (1997–2006), Farscape (1999–2003) and The Hoobs (2001–2003). In addition to assuming an executive producer role, Henson served as the head judge on the 2014 reality television show Jim Henson's Creature Shop Challenge. He performed the roles of Janice and Scooter in the 2002 television film It's a Very Merry Muppet Christmas Movie.

Henson returned to perform Sal Minella, a character he created for Muppets Tonight, in Muppets Haunted Mansion (2021).

=== Other ventures ===
Henson is the cocreator, producer and performer for the adult-themed puppet-based variety show Puppet Up!, and has played various characters from the show on the British program That Puppet Game Show.

For The Muppet Show Live in 2001, Henson performed his own Muppet characters and one of his father's characters, The Newsman, for the first time. He reprised the role for the 2003 video game Muppets Party Cruise.

== Personal life ==
Henson married Ellis Flyte, costume designer for the 1986 fantasy adventure film Labyrinth, in November 1990. They divorced in 2002. In 2005, Henson had a daughter with Mia Sara. They married in 2010.

== Filmography ==
=== Film ===
Year	Title	Role	Notes
1981	The Great Muppet Caper	Muppet performer	Also made a cameo appearance
1984	The Muppets Take Manhattan	Muppet performer	Uncredited
1985	Return to Oz	Jack Pumpkinhead (voice actor)	Puppeteer of head and hands
1985	Santa Claus: The Movie	Animatronic puppeteer	
1986	Little Shop of Horrors	Principal puppeteer	
1986	Labyrinth	Hoggle/Goblin (voice actor)	
1987	Jim Henson Presents Mother Goose Stories	Co-director	
1990	Teenage Mutant Ninja Turtles	Second unit director/Chief puppeteer	
1990	The Witches	Puppeteer	
1990	Basil Hears a Noise	Puppeteer; Executive producer	Uncredited
1992	The Muppet Christmas Carol	Director/Producer	
1996	Muppet Treasure Island	Director/Producer	
1997	Buddy	Executive producer	
1999	Muppets from Space	Dr. Phil Van Neuter/Sal Minella/Talking Sandwich (as a Muppet performer); Producer	
1999	The Adventures of Elmo in Grouchland	Executive producer	
2017	The Star	Executive producer	
2018	The Happytime Murders	Crab/on-screen cameo (photograph); Director; producer	

=== Television ===
Year	Title	Role	Notes
1986	The Christmas Toy	Cruiser	TV movie
1988–1991	The Storyteller	Storyteller's Dog/Devil/Griffin	
1989–1990	The Jim Henson Hour	Storyteller's Dog/Dog the Dinosaur/ Head of the Ultragorgon	
1990	Basil Hears a Noise	Puppeteer; Executive producer	TV movie
1991–1994	Dinosaurs	Grandma Ethyl Phillips/Arthur Rizzic; Executive producer	
1992–1994	Dog City	Executive producer	
1996	Aliens in the Family	Executive producer	
1996	Gulliver's Travels	Co-executive producer	
1996–1998	Muppets Tonight	Sal Minella/Dr. Phil Van Neuter/Seymour/Nigel; Writer	
1997–2003	Bear in the Big Blue House	Executive producer	
1999	Alice in Wonderland	Executive producer	TV movie
1999–2003	Farscape	Executive producer	
2001	Jack and the Beanstalk: The Real Story	Director and writer	TV movie
2002	It's a Very Merry Muppet Christmas Movie	Scooter/Sal Minella/Janice; Executive producer	TV movie
2004	Farscape: The Peacekeeper Wars	Director/Executive producer	
2005	The Muppets' Wizard of Oz	Sal Minella; Executive producer	TV movie
2008	Jim Henson's Pajanimals	Executive producer	
2008–2009	Sid the Science Kid	Executive producer	
2009–2011	Dinosaur Train	Executive producer	
2010	Hot Dog TV	Voice; Director	
2013	That Puppet Game Show	Various	
2014	Jim Henson's Creature Shop Challenge	Executive producer and Head Judge	
2020	Prop Culture	Himself	Episode: "The Muppet Movie"
2020	Earth to Ned	Vincent	Episode: "I've Got a Ned Feeling About This"; Also executive producer
2021	Muppets Haunted Mansion	Sal Minella	Halloween special for Disney+

=== Video games ===
Year	Title	Roles	Notes
2000	Muppet RaceMania	Sal Minella/Dr. Phil Van Neuter	Voice
2003	Muppets Party Cruise	Scooter/Sal Minella/Janice/The Muppet Newsman	Voice

== Awards and nominations ==
Year	Association	Nominated work	Category	Result	Ref(s)
1996	Primetime Emmy Awards	Gulliver's Travels	Outstanding Miniseries	Won	
1996	Primetime Emmy Awards	Muppets Tonight	Outstanding Variety, Music or Comedy Series	Nominated	
1997	Primetime Emmy Awards	The Wubbulous World of Dr. Seuss	Outstanding Children's Program	Nominated	
1997	Satellite Awards	Muppet Treasure Island	Best Animated or Mixed Media Film	Nominated	
1998	Primetime Emmy Awards	The Wubbulous World of Dr. Seuss	Outstanding Children's Program	Nominated	
1998	Primetime Emmy Awards	Muppets Tonight	Outstanding Children's Program	Won	
2019	Golden Raspberry Awards	The Happytime Murders	Worst Picture	Nominated	
2019	Golden Raspberry Awards	The Happytime Murders	Worst Director	Nominated	

Preceded by None	Performer of Andy; 1994	Succeeded by Steve Whitmire
Preceded by Matt Vogel	Performer of Scooter; 2002–2003	Succeeded by Rickey Boyd
Preceded by Jerry Nelson	Performer of Sal Minella; 1996–2007, 2021–present	Succeeded by None
Preceded by Matt Vogel	Performer of Janice; 2002–2003	Succeeded by Tyler Bunch
Preceded by Jerry Nelson	Performer of The Muppet Newsman; 2001–2003	Succeeded by Steve Whitmire
