= The Jim Henson Company =

American entertainment company

The Jim Henson Company, Inc.
- Logo used since 2001

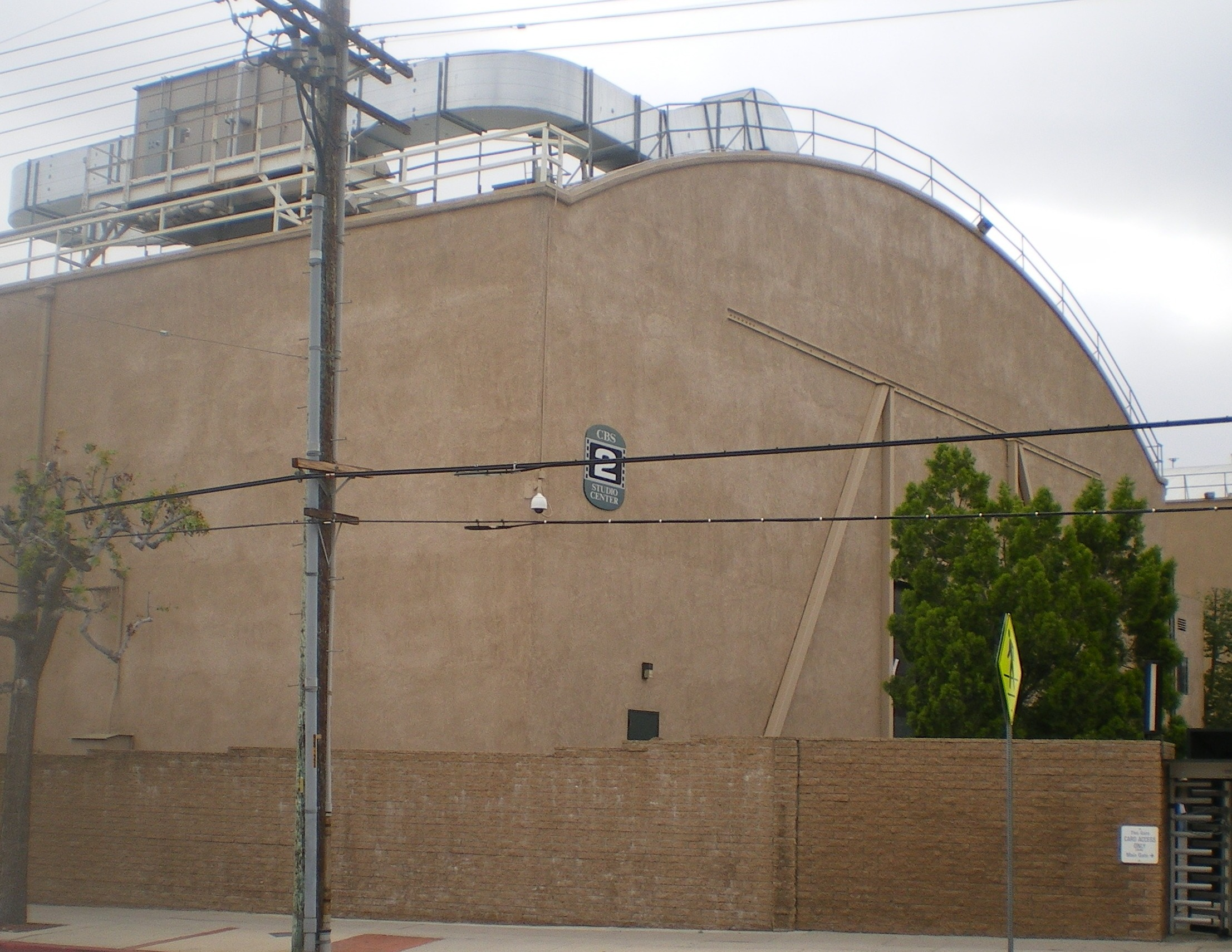
- The Radford Studio Center in Los Angeles, pictured in 2012
- Formerly: Muppets, Inc. (1958–1976; 1985); Henson Associates, Inc. (1976–1987); Jim Henson Productions, Inc. (1987–1997)
- Type: Private
- Industry: Entertainment
- Founded: November 20, 1958; 67 years ago
- Founders: Jim and Jane Henson
- Headquarters: Radford Studio Center, Studio City, Los Angeles, U.S.
- Key people: Brian Henson (chairman); Lisa Henson (president & CEO)
- Products: Puppetry, Animation, Computer graphics, Digital puppetry, Entertainment
- Brands: The Muppets (1955–2004)† (Note: In February 2004, the company sold the rights to The Muppets to The Walt Disney Company, now controlling the Muppets through its subsidiary The Muppets Studio.); Sesame Street Muppets (1969–2001)† (Note: In January 2001, the company sold the rights to the Sesame Street Muppets to Sesame Workshop.); Bear in the Big Blue House (1997–2004)† (Note: In February 2004, the company sold the rights to Bear in the Big Blue House to The Walt Disney Company, now controlling Bear through its subsidiary The Muppets Studio.); The Dark Crystal; Labyrinth; Fraggle Rock
- Owner: Henson family
- Divisions: Jim Henson's Creature Shop; Jim Henson Animation Studios; Henson Alternative
- Website: henson.com

The Jim Henson Company, Inc. (formerly known as Muppets, Inc., Henson Associates, Inc., and Jim Henson Productions, Inc.; commonly referred to as Henson) is an American entertainment company located in Los Angeles, California. The company is known for its innovations in the field of puppetry, particularly through the creation of Kermit the Frog and the Muppets characters.

Brian Henson is chairman and Lisa Henson is CEO. Since 2026, The Jim Henson Company is headquartered at the Radford Studio Center in Studio City.

The company was established on November 20, 1958 by puppeteers Jim and Jane Henson, and is currently independently owned and operated by their children. Henson has produced many successful television series, including The Muppet Show (1976–1981), Fraggle Rock (1983–1987), and Bear in the Big Blue House (1997–2006); as well, the company designed the Muppet characters for Sesame Street (1969–present).

The company has also produced theatrical films, including The Muppet Movie (1979), The Dark Crystal (1982) and Labyrinth (1986). Henson also operates Jim Henson's Creature Shop, an animatronics and special effects studio which has created characters and digital effects for both Henson productions and outside projects. In 1989, the company entered merger negotiations with the Walt Disney Company, which were canceled following Jim Henson's death in 1990.

Subsequently, control of the company was assumed by Henson's children: Lisa, Cheryl, Brian, John, and Heather. In 2000, Henson was sold to German media company EM.TV & Merchandising AG; by the end of that year, however, EM.TV's stock collapsed, and the Henson family re-acquired the company in 2003.

In the interim, EM.TV sold the rights to the Sesame Street Muppets to Sesame Workshop in early January 2001, following a December 2000 announcement. Henson sold The Muppets and Bear in the Big Blue House properties to Disney in 2004, but retains the remainder of its program library and assets.

As of 2026, Brian, Lisa, Cheryl, and Heather Henson maintain control of the company. Their mother, Jane Henson, died on April 2, 2013 and brother, John Henson, died on February 14, 2014.

== History ==
=== 1958–1990 ===
Jim and Jane Henson officially founded Muppets, Inc. on November 20, 1958, three years after Sam and Friends debuted on WRC-TV in Washington, D.C. Aside from Sam and Friends, the majority of its work until 1969 was in advertising; appearances on late-night talk shows; and short "meeting films" primarily for enterprise use, produced from 1965 to 1996. In 1968, the company began designing characters and producing short films for the fledgling Sesame Street, which premiered on NET (succeeded by PBS) in November 1969.

One of the company's first characters to appear regularly on television, Rowlf the Dog, originated in commercials for Purina Dog Chow and became a regular character on The Jimmy Dean Show from 1963 to 1966. During this time, the show's host, Jimmy Dean, refused an opportunity to own 40% of the company, assuming that he did not attain that right. Jim Henson also pitched several different projects to the major American television networks, to little avail. Some ideas became unaired pilots, while others were never produced. NBC included the Muppets as part of “The Land of Gorch” sketch series on the first season of Saturday Night Live (then just Saturday Night). However, disagreements between Henson’s team and the SNL cast and crew ultimately led to the partnership dissolving.

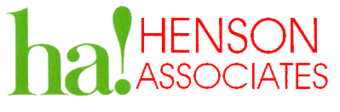
Henson Associates logo from 1976 to 1987.

In 1976, producer Lew Grade approached Henson to produce a weekly series in Grade's native United Kingdom. This series became The Muppet Show, produced by Associated Television (ATV) for the ITV network. The success of The Muppet Show led to the Muppets becoming an enduring media franchise. Another company controlled by Grade, ITC Entertainment, originally owned The Muppet Show, among other Henson productions, but Henson acquired the rights to these productions in the 1980s. During this time, Henson formed Jim Henson's Creature Shop, a special effects studio partially responsible for the films The Dark Crystal and Labyrinth; and television series The StoryTeller, Farscape, and Dinosaurs.

In 1983, the company launched a home video division, Muppet Home Video. The company signed home video deals in North America with Walt Disney Telecommunications and Non-Theatrical Company and other companies for international distribution. In 1985, it was reconsituted for home video as Jim Henson Presents, and Playhouse Video begin distributing titles under the new name Jim Henson's Muppet Video. The Muppet Video name was also used by Thorn EMI/HBO Video to release full-length tapes based on Fraggle Rock.

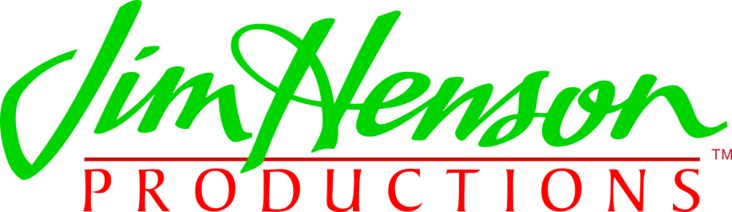
Jim Henson Productions logo from 1988 to 2001.

Later in his life, Henson produced Fraggle Rock and The Jim Henson Hour. In August 1989, Henson and Disney CEO Michael Eisner began merger discussions reportedly valued at $150 million, which also included a fifteen-year contract for Henson's personal "creative services." However, the deal did not include the rights to the Sesame Street characters, which were owned by Henson, although merchandising revenue was split between Henson and the Children's Television Workshop.

Also during the negotiations, management of the company's Henson International Television distribution unit based in the United Kingdom purchased their unit from the company, leading to the establishment of HIT Entertainment. On May 16, 1990, as negotiations continued, Jim Henson died of toxic shock syndrome. Following Henson's death, neither Disney nor Jim Henson Productions could come to an accord. Negotiations officially ended in December 1990, and Henson remained an independent company.

=== 1991–1999 ===
The Henson family assumed management of the company, and Brian Henson was named president, chairman, and CEO in January 1991. In the following years, Henson entered into deals with several companies, including television rights to the Henson library with Disney Channel and Nickelodeon; a record label with BMG Kidz; and a home media label called Jim Henson Video in partnership with Buena Vista Home Video, which lasted until late 1997. In 1995, Henson entered into an agreement with ABC to produce primetime television series, leading to Muppets Tonight and Aliens in the Family.

Following the releases of The Muppet Christmas Carol and Muppet Treasure Island by Walt Disney Pictures, Henson formed Jim Henson Pictures with Sony Pictures Entertainment. In 1998, the company signed a deal with Columbia TriStar Home Video to launch Jim Henson Home Entertainment. By 1999, Henson held partial interests in two cable channels: The Kermit Channel (broadcasting in Asia) and Odyssey Network (broadcasting in the United States), both jointly owned with Hallmark Entertainment. After Hallmark (through Crown Media Holdings) assumed full ownership of these networks, the Kermit Channel was discontinued and Odyssey was renamed the Hallmark Channel.

=== 2000–2004 ===
In 2000, the Henson family sold the company to the German media company EM.TV & Merchandising AG, for $680 million. That summer, EM.TV sold Henson's stakes in the Odyssey and Kermit cable channels in exchange for an 8.2% stake in Hallmark-controlled Crown Media Holdings. By the end of 2000, after EM.TV subsequently experienced major financial problems, EM.TV sold the company's ownership of the Sesame Street Muppets and Henson's small interest in the Noggin television network to Sesame Workshop, and by early 2001, Henson itself was marked for sale. Disney, Viacom, HIT Entertainment, AOL Time Warner, Haim Saban, Classic Media, as well as Henson management, among others, were all parties reportedly interested in acquiring the company.

In December 2002, a deal was announced in which EM.TV would sell a 49.9% stake in Henson to an investment group led by Dean Valentine, a former executive at Disney and UPN. However, in March 2003, the deal was canceled, citing financial issues on Valentine's part. In May 2003, EM.TV was reportedly nearing an agreement to sell Henson to a consortium between Classic Media and Sesame Workshop (with financing from Sony Pictures Entertainment), until the Henson family re-acquired the company for a closing price of $84 million.

Four months later in September of that year following the re-acquisition of The Jim Henson Company by the Henson family from EM.TV in May of that year, The Jim Henson Company had shuttered its British production operations as its two UK/European executives Martin Baker and Angus Fletcher departed the company.

In February 2004, Henson sold the Muppets and Bear in the Big Blue House to Disney, who subsequently formed The Muppets Studio (known at that time as The Muppets Holding Company). The term "Muppet", likewise, became a legal trademark of Disney; Sesame Workshop retained permission to use the term for its Sesame Street characters under a perpetuity license from Disney.

=== 2004–2024 ===
On April 1, 2004, Henson and HIT Entertainment agreed to a five-year global distribution and production deal which included distribution of 440 hours of the company's remaining library including Fraggle Rock, Emmet Otter's Jug-Band Christmas, The Hoobs and Jim Henson's Mother Goose Stories. In addition, the agreement also included the production of new properties, including Frances, in which both companies co-produced and also both co-own the copyright to the series. After that deal expired in April 2009, Henson entered into similar agreements with Lionsgate Home Entertainment on August 10, 2009 and later with Gaiam Vivendi Entertainment three years later on October 25, 2012. As well, the company became involved with computer-animated projects, including the direct-to-video Unstable Fables series; Sid the Science Kid; Dinosaur Train; and Splash and Bubbles, as well as the puppet series Pajanimals.

Henson later formed Henson Alternative, which specializes in adult content, including the live shows known alternatively as Puppet Improv, Puppet Up!, and Stuffed and Unstrung. In recent years, the Fraggle Rock characters have made several appearances, usually at special events. The characters appeared with Ben Folds Five in the music video for "Do It Anyway"; and in 2013, Gobo and Red Fraggle hosted a Fraggle Rock marathon on the Hub Network.

In 2019, The Dark Crystal: Age of Resistance, a prequel to The Dark Crystal, premiered on Netflix. In 2022, Fraggle Rock: Back to the Rock, a reboot of Fraggle Rock, premiered on Apple TV+.

On August 10, 2022, the company signed a worldwide distribution agreement with Shout! Factory which would allow Shout! to distribute thirteen series and specials from the Henson catalog on home entertainment and streaming platforms across all territories. A similar worldwide distribution agreement went into effect on January 5, 2024, for streaming, video on demand, broadcast, digital download, packaged media and certain non-theatrical rights for the films Labyrinth and The Dark Crystal, as well as its behind the scenes specials Inside the Labyrinth and The World of the Dark Crystal.

=== 2024-present ===
On June 20, 2024, the company announced they were planning to sell the Jim Henson Company Lot (now known as Chaplin Studios) off La Brea Avenue in Hollywood, which it purchased in 1999, as “part of a much longer-term strategy to have The Jim Henson Company and our renowned Burbank-based Jim Henson’s Creature Shop under one roof, which is not feasible in Hollywood due to the space the Shop requires.” In November 2024, film producer McG and musician John Mayer bought the lot for $40 million. The 12-foot (3.7 m) color statue of Kermit the Frog statue, dressed as Charlie Chaplin's character The Tramp, which stands above the studio's main gate since June 2000, was donated to the Center for Puppetry Arts.

On February 25, 2025, the company appointed DeAPlaneta Entertainment as its distributor and licensor for several Henson properties such as Fraggle Rock, Dinosaur Train, Dot. and Pajanimals in European territories.

== Staff ==
=== Henson family ===
- Jim Henson (1936–1990) – Founder of The Jim Henson Company.
- Jane Henson (1934–2013) – Co-founder of The Jim Henson Company.
- Brian Henson – Chairman of The Jim Henson Company.
- Lisa Henson – CEO of The Jim Henson Company.
- Cheryl Henson – Board of Directors member, President of the Jim Henson Foundation. Formerly a liaison to Sesame Workshop from 1992 to 2000.
- John Henson (1965–2014) – Board of Directors member.
- Heather Henson – Board of Directors member.

=== Leadership ===
- Chris Lytton – President and COO of The Jim Henson Company.
- Lori Don – Executive Vice President and CFO of The Jim Henson Company.
- Richard Goldsmith – Executive Vice President, Global Distribution, and International Consumer Projects.
- Joe Henderson – Executive Vice President, Worldwide Administration.
- Stephanie Schroeder – Executive Vice President, Business Affairs & Legal.
- Halle Stanford – Executive Vice President of Children's Entertainment.
- Nicole Goldman – Senior Vice President, Marketing and Publicity.
- Anthony Wood - Senior Vice President of Human Resources.
- Karen Lee Arbeeny – Vice President, Business Operations, Global Distribution.
- Faryal Ganjehei – Vice President and Studio Operations at the Henson Recording Studio.
- Anna Jordan Douglass – Vice President, Digital Development & Interactive Media.
- Howard Sharp – Vice President of Administration.
- Peter Brooke – Creative Supervisor at Jim Henson's Creature Shop.
- Jerry Houle - Vice President of Marketing 1977–1984
- Bryan O'Connell - Vice President, Children's Television.

=== Other staff members ===
- Karen Falk – Historian and archivist.

== Filmography ==
=== Television ===
Jim Henson Television
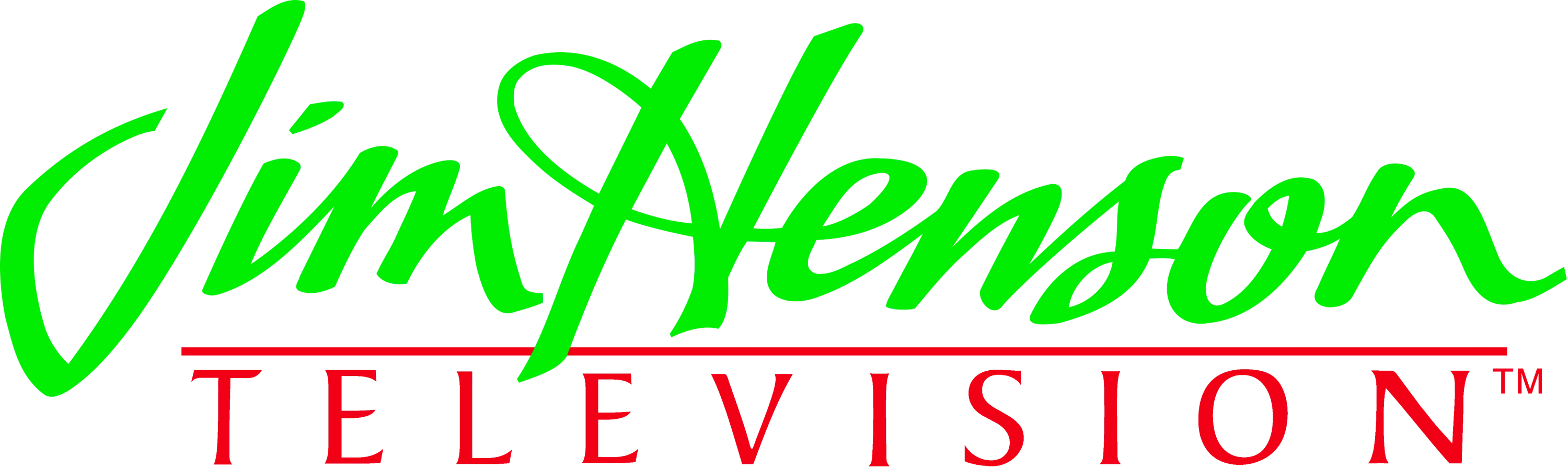
- The Jim Henson Television logo used from 1997 to 2006.
- Type: Division of The Jim Henson Company
- Industry: Television production
- Founded: 1955; 71 years ago
- Founder: Jim Henson
- Defunct: April 28, 2006; 20 years ago
- Fate: Disbanded and folded into The Jim Henson Company
- Headquarters: United States
- Area served: Worldwide
- Products: Television series

From 1969 to 2001, Henson was contracted to design and create Muppet characters for Sesame Street. With the exception of occasional appearances in the Muppets franchise, the characters were used exclusively for Sesame Street, but Henson legally owned these characters prior to their acquisition by Sesame Workshop. The only exception was Kermit the Frog, who was featured in other projects prior to Sesame Street. Sesame Workshop retains the rights to use any Sesame Street footage featuring the character.

The sale ended any direct affiliation between The Muppets and Sesame Street, although the series retains use of the term "Muppet" under license from Disney. Many of the puppeteers continue to perform with both The Muppets and Sesame Street franchises. While no longer owning the Sesame Street characters, Henson continues to design them. This list excludes pre-2001 Sesame Street co-productions outside the United States.

== See also ==
- Sesame Workshop
- Ragdoll Productions
- Tippett Studio
