= Brian Jay Jones =

American biographer

- Born: August 1, 1967 (age 59); Kansas City, Kansas
- Education: University of New Mexico
- Occupations: Biographer; speechwriter; policy advisor
- Writing career
- Genre: biography
- Notable works: Jim Henson: The Biography (2013), Becoming Dr. Seuss (2019)
- Notable awards: Goodreads Choice Award Best History & Biography (2013)
- Website: brianjayjones.com

Brian Jay Jones (born August 1, 1967) is an American biographer, primarily of American pop culture icons. He is a former president of Biographers International Organization.

== Biography ==
Born in Kansas City, Kansas, Jones was raised primarily in Albuquerque, New Mexico. He attended Eldorado High School and graduated from the University of New Mexico, where he earned a degree in English in 1989.

For nearly a decade, Jones served as a Legislative Assistant and speechwriter in the United States Senate, working for U.S. Senators Pete V. Domenici and James M. Jeffords. He specialized in policy matters relating to education, civil rights, and welfare reform, and served as staff member on the United States Senate Health Subcommittee on Children and Families. Jones has also been an Associate State Superintendent for Education for the State of Arizona, and has served as an advisor to several locally elected officials in Maryland.

== Career ==
In 2008, Jones published Washington Irving: An American Original, a project he spent seven years writing and researching. As one of the first biographies of the American author and statesman in eight decades, Washington Irving was praised by the Associated Press as "authoritative" and "charming" by the New York Times. In 2010, Jones was awarded the Washington Irving Medal for Literary Excellence from the St. Nicholas Society of New York.

Jones has been an active member of Biographers International Organization (BIO), a non-profit organization founded to promote the art and craft of biography, since its inception in 2009. In 2012, he was elected vice president of the organization, where he played a key role in creating BIO's Plutarch Award. In 2014, he was elected to a two-year term as BIO's president.

In September 2013, Jones published Jim Henson: The Biography, the first comprehensive biography of Muppet creator Jim Henson. Hailed as "masterful" by Kirkus Reviews, Jim Henson was a New York Times bestseller, and received the 2013 Goodreads Choice Award for Best History & Biography, as well as being selected by CNN viewers as a "Favorite Book of 2013.". Henson's longtime associate Frank Oz publicly praised the book, saying, "Brian Jay Jones has captured the layers of Jim’s genius and humanity, as well as the flaws that made Jim, like all of us, so delightfully imperfect. Jim needed this book to be written," while lifelong Muppet fan Neil Patrick Harris called it "an absolute must-read!" Named a "Book of the Year" by Bookpage, it was also shortlisted for the Plutarch Award for the best biography of 2013.

December 2016 saw the publication of George Lucas: A Life, a full-length, comprehensive biography of Star Wars creator George Lucas. Lauded by the Washington Post as "admirably comprehensive", George Lucas was hailed by Kirkus as a "sweeping, perceptive biography," and was named one of the Best Books of 2016.

In May 2019, Dutton published Jones' biography of children's author Dr. Seuss, Becoming Dr. Seuss: Theodor Geisel and the Making of an American Imagination. The book was praised by NPR as "nuanced, profoundly human, and painstakingly researched," and was long-listed for the Andrew Carnegie Medals for Excellence in Fiction and Nonfiction.

A self-proclaimed "pop culture junkie", Jones has discussed at length his particular affection for the Beatles and comic books, especially the character Batman and the writer Alan Moore.

Jones has made multiple appearances on The George Lucas Talk Show marathon fundraisers, including: The George Lucas Talk Show All Day Star Wars Movie Watch Along, LucasLynch (On The Air/ Radioland Murders marathon), and The George Lucas Holiday Special.

== Bibliography ==
- Washington Irving: An American Original (Arcade, 2008)
- Jim Henson: The Biography (Ballantine, 2013)
- George Lucas: A Life (Little, Brown, 2016)
- Becoming Dr. Seuss: Theodor Geisel and the Making of an American Imagination (Dutton, 2019)
