= Jim Henson's Creature Shop =

American special and visual effects company

- Type: Division
- Industry: Animation; Special effects; Puppets; Animatronics; Creature suit; Visual effects
- Founded: 1979; 47 years ago, in Hampstead, England
- Founder: Jim Henson; Brian Froud
- Headquarters: Los Angeles, California, United States
- Parent: The Jim Henson Company
- Website: creatureshop.com

Jim Henson's Creature Shop is an American animation and special/visual effects company founded in 1979 by Jim Henson, creator of The Muppets. The company is based in Los Angeles, California, United States.

== History ==
Jim Henson's Creature Shop was originally created as a partnership with British illustrator Brian Froud to facilitate the production of The Dark Crystal. Originally located in Hampstead, London, it received its name in order to differentiate it from Jim Henson's original puppet workshop in New York City. It was then used for future productions such as Labyrinth and The StoryTeller.

It was relocated to Camden Town following Henson's death in 1990 and his son, Brian Henson, took it over. A third location in Burbank, California opened to serve Hollywood, and one of its first projects was the Dinosaurs television series. Its main animatronic supervisor is London native David Barrington-Holt.

Since The Jim Henson Company sold off the rights to The Muppets brand to Disney in 2004; the Muppet Workshop in New York is now credited as Jim Henson's Creature Shop. In the modern day, the New York shop specializes in hand puppets, including building The Muppets and most of the puppets in Sesame Street. The Los Angeles branch creates more realistic animatronic creatures and creature suits.

The location at Camden Town, London closed in Spring 2005, and was converted into a luxury apartment known as The Henson.

In addition to practical effects, the shop also specializes in "digital puppetry", a form of computer animation that controls a digital avatar using manual puppet controls to animate them more quickly and easily than if it was entirely digital. This is known as the "Henson Digital Puppetry Studio" and is used extensively in television, including the entirety of the series Sid the Science Kid.

Besides films, the Creature Shop has created costumes for live events and theme park appearances. They created a realistic Smilodon "full-suit puppet" for a show at the Natural History Museum of Los Angeles County, which cost more than $100,000. Some of their other costumes include the Polar Bear for Coca-Cola, Tony the Tiger, Shrek, Tommy and Chuckie from Rugrats, the Teenage Mutant Ninja Turtles, and the animatronics from Five Nights at Freddy’s. They also create Deadmau5' "mau5heads" for his media appearances and live performances.

== Selected filmography ==
- Sesame Street (1969–present) (puppets (for later post-2000 seasons, built by Jim Henson's Creature Shop, New York City))
- The Dark Crystal (1982) (creature effects)
- Dreamchild (1985) (creature effects)
- Labyrinth (1986) (creature effects)
- The StoryTeller (1987) (creature effects)
- The Bear (1988) (creature effects)
- Lighthouse Island (1989) (special effects)
- Monster Maker (1989)
- The Ghost of Faffner Hall (1989) (puppets)
- Teenage Mutant Ninja Turtles (1990) (creature effects)
- The Witches (1990) (creature effects)
- Teenage Mutant Ninja Turtles II: The Secret of the Ooze (1991) (creature effects)
- Dinosaurs (1991-1994) (creature effects)
- The Polar Bear King (1991) (creature effects)
- Honey, I Blew Up the Kid (1992) (special effects)
- The Muppet Christmas Carol (1992) (special effects and miniatures)
- Wolf It (1993-1996) (Bro and Bro puppets)
- The Neverending Story III (1994) (creature effects)
- The Flintstones (1994) (creature effects)
- Babe (1995) (creature effects)
- Cutthroat Island (1995) (creature effects)
- The Indian in the Cupboard (1995) (creature effects)
- 101 Dalmatians (1996) (creature effects)
- Gulliver's Travels (1996) (creature effects)
- The English Patient (1996) (visual effects)
- Muppet Treasure Island (1996) (special effects and miniatures)
- The Phantom (1996) (costume effects)
- Samson and Delilah (1996) (mechanical lion)
- The Fifth Element (1997) (creature effects)
- Buddy (1997) (creature effects)
- George of the Jungle (1997) (creature effects)
- The Odyssey (1997) (creature effects)
- Lost in Space (1998) (creature effects)
- Dr. Dolittle (1998) (creature effects)
- Jack Frost (1998) (special effects)
- Alice In Wonderland (1999) (creature effects)
- Animal Farm (1999) (creature effects)
- My Favorite Martian (1999) (creature design)
- The Adventures of Elmo in Grouchland (1999) (puppets)
- The Talented Mr. Ripley (1999) (visual effects)
- Farscape (1999) (creature effects)
- Between the Lions (2000-2010)
- Mission to Mars (2000) (wire removal)
- The Flintstones in Viva Rock Vegas (2000) (creature effects)
- Rat (2000) (special effects)
- Brotherhood of the Wolf (2001) (creature effects)
- Cats & Dogs (2001) (creature effects)
- Harry Potter and the Philosopher's Stone (2001) (creature effects)
- Gosford Park (2001) (digital effects)
- Snow Dogs (2002) (creature effects)
- Snow Queen (2002) (creature effects)
- Stuart Little 2 (2002) (creature effects)
- The Master of Disguise (2002) (specialty props)
- The Country Bears (2002) (creature effects)
- Looney Tunes: Back in Action (2003) (stand-in puppets)
- Lara Croft Tomb Raider: The Cradle of Life (2003) (visual effects)
- Around the World in 80 Days (2004) (visual effects)
- Five Children and It (2004) (character animation, special effects, digital puppetry and animatronics)
- Pride (2004) (special effects)
- Are We There Yet? (2005) (performance animation)
- The Hitchhiker's Guide to the Galaxy (2005) (puppets)
- Batman Begins (2005) (visual effects for Scarecrow)
- Mee-Shee: The Water Giant (2005) (creature effects, special effects and digital puppetry)
- The Producers (2005) (creature effects)
- The Darjeeling Limited (2007) (animatronic tiger)
- Forgetting Sarah Marshall (2008) (puppets)
- The Hangover (2009) (tiger in a car)
- Where the Wild Things Are (2009) (creature effects)
- The Muppets (2011) (puppets)
- Rick And Morty (2013) (Toon Boom 2D Digital Puppet Animation)
- Muppets Most Wanted (2014) (puppets, along with Puppet Heap)
- Jim Henson's Creature Shop Challenge (2014)
- Oscar's Hotel for Fantastical Creatures (2014-2015)
- Grumpy Cat's Worst Christmas Ever (2014) (puppets and stand-in puppets)
- Turkey Hollow (2015) (creature effects)
- The Jungle Book (2016) (stand-in puppets)
- The Dark Crystal: Age of Resistance (2019)
- Earth to Ned (2020)
- Come Play (2020) (creature design and fabrication)
- Solar Opposites (2020) (Toon Boom 2D Digital Puppet Animation)
- Duff's Happy Fun Bake Time (2021)
- Muppets Haunted Mansion (2021) (puppets)
- The Curse of Bridge Hollow (2022) (creature effects)
- Fraggle Rock: Back to the Rock (2022–present)
- Five Nights at Freddy's (2023) (animatronics)
- Five Nights at Freddy's 2 (2025) (animatronics)
- V/H/S/Mixtape (2026)

=== Other ===
- Frosted Flakes (Tony the Tiger)
- Snuggle (Snuggle Bear)
- LendingTree (Lenny)
- Hamburger Helper (Hamburger Helper Glove)
- Star Fox Zero (Commercials)
- The Joy of Music ("Joy")
- Rascal (Main character and enemies design)
- Ghosts (practical effects)

=== Jim Henson Alternative ===
- Puppet Up! - Uncensored
- 53rd Annual Grammy Awards (2011)
- Nintendo Digital Event @ E3 2015 (2015)
- The Happytime Murders (2018) (puppets)
- Coldplay's Music of the Spheres "Biutyful" music video (The Weirdos) (2022)

== See also ==
- Practical effect
- Creature suit
