= Muppets Party Cruise =

2003 video game

- Developer: Mass Media
- Publishers: NA: TDK Mediactive; EU: Global Star Software
- Composer: Chris Tilton
- Series: The Muppets
- Platforms: GameCube, PlayStation 2
- Release: PlayStation 2: NA: November 13, 2003; PAL: April 16, 2004; GameCube: NA: November 26, 2003
- Genre: Party
- Modes: Single-player, multiplayer

Muppets Party Cruise is a 2003 party video game, based on The Muppets franchise, developed by Mass Media and published by TDK Mediactive for the PlayStation 2 and GameCube.

This was the Muppets' last video game before the franchise was acquired by The Walt Disney Company in 2004.

== Gameplay ==
Muppets Party Cruise has six playable characters: Kermit, Piggy, Fozzie, Gonzo, Animal and Pepe. The game contains 30 mini-games, 15 of which the player must unlock, and five levels: the Engine Room, Crew's Quarters, Quality Cabins, Star Suites and Royal Staterooms. Players may also choose between a long and short cruise.

The currency is party favors that are accrued by unlocking additional party games from the menu, but during gameplay, players use cruise credits.

In "long cruise" mode, players may freely roam a tiled cruise ship. They roll a die at the start of each round and may advance that number of spaces. Around the walls of the cruise ship are doors; entering the blue, red or green doors starts multiplayer mini-games, and entering the yellow doors rewards the player with lottery-style one-player games in which the player may win more cruise credits. When a player wins a mini-game accessed via a red, blue or green door, the player receives a party favor of that color. When a player accumulates enough party favors, the game is over and the total party favors collected by all players are added to the saved balance, which can unlock mini-games.

In "short cruise" mode, the first player may select a mini-game in which everyone will compete, but no party favors are won.

== Reception ==
The game received "average" reviews according to video game review score aggregator Metacritic.
