= Jim Henson Foundation =

American charity

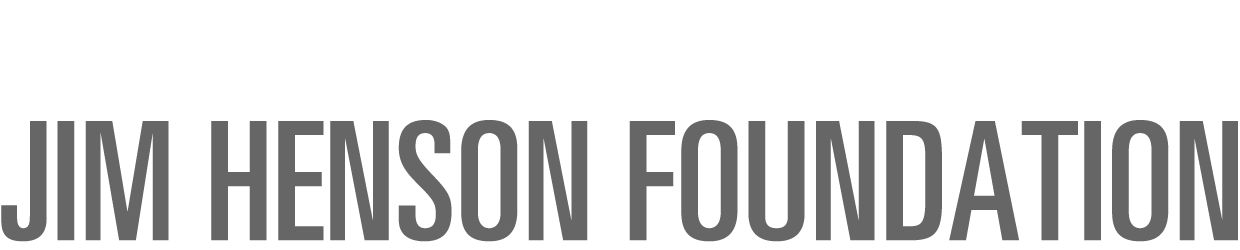
- Formation: 1982; 44 years ago
- Tax ID no.: 13-3133702
- Legal status: 501(c)(3) private foundation
- Headquarters: Long Island City, New York, United States
- President: Cheryl Henson
- Key people: Richard Termine; Pam Arciero; Louis Borodinsky; Lindsey "Z." Briggs
- Revenue: $598,926 (2019)
- Expenses: $391,982 (2019)
- Website: www.hensonfoundation.org

The Jim Henson Foundation is a foundation that was founded by puppeteer and Muppet creator Jim Henson to promote and develop puppetry in the United States. Since 1992, Jim Henson's daughter Cheryl Henson has served as the president for the Foundation.

== History ==
The Jim Henson Foundation was established in 1982 by puppeteer Jim Henson. It was originally known as the Henson Foundation and was created to support the development of puppetry in the United States. The foundation's early activities included providing grants to puppetry artists and supporting the development of new puppet theater works.

Following Henson's death in 1990, the foundation continued its activities under the leadership of his family and staff. In 1992, his daughter Cheryl Henson became president of the foundation. In 2024, Cheryl Henson endowed the foundation with proceeds from the sale of the former Charlie Chaplin Studio, with the stated aim of providing long-term support for its grant programs.

== Grant recipients ==
The Jim Henson Foundation has given over 1000 grants to date totaling over $4.2 million in grants, of which over $2.8 million was awarded directly to puppet artists. Past grant recipients include MacArthur Fellow Julie Taymor, director of the Broadway musical, The Lion King; Roman Paska, whose dramatic interpretation of Strindberg's The Ghost Sonata was a hit at the 1994 Henson Festival; Ralph Lee, whose production A Popol Vuh Story was also presented at the 1994 Henson Festival and went on to tour New York City public schools; MacArthur Fellow Lee Breuer's company Mabou Mines, whose production Peter & Wendy was featured at the 1996 Spoleto Festival and the 1996 Henson Festival, followed by a month-long run at New York's New Victory Theater; Rome Prize recipient Dan Hurlin; Doris Duke Award recipient Janie Geiser; and MacArthur Fellow and Doris Duke Performing Artist Award Basil Twist, whose production Symphonie Fantastique had an acclaimed year-long run in New York.

The Foundation awards Artist Grants in three categories: Production ($7,000), Workshop ($3,000) and Family ($4,000). In 2015, the Jim Henson Foundation Residency at the Eugene O'Neill Theater Center was established. In 2017, the Allelu Award for International presentations was created in honor of past board Foundation board member and UNIMA-USA Secretary Allelu Kurten.

The Jim Henson Foundation compiles listings of puppet theater performances, workshops, festivals and exhibits occurring in New York City, around the United States and internationally and shares them through a weekly Friday email list called Puppet Happenings and on the Foundation's website listings of the same name at PuppetHappenings.org.

== Notable people ==
- Emily DeCola, New York City based puppet performer and designer.
