= Fairless =

Fairless is a surname. Notable people with the surname include:

- Benjamin Franklin Fairless (1890–1962), American steel company executive
- Jack Fairless, manager of the English football club Darlington from 1928 to 1933
- Rick Fairless, well-known figure in custom choppers
- Stephen Fairless, Australian cyclist and olympian
- Thomas Kerr Fairless, English painter

== See also ==
- Fairless High School, public high school in Brewster, Ohio
- Fairless Hills, Pennsylvania, census-designated place (CDP) in Bucks County, Pennsylvania, United States
- Fairless Local School District, school district located in Stark County, Ohio, United States
