= Being Elmo: A Puppeteer's Journey =

- Theatrical release poster by Scott McDermott
- Directed by: Constance Marks
- Written by: Philip Shane; Justin Weinstein
- Produced by: Constance Marks; Corinne LaPook; James Miller
- Narrated by: Whoopi Goldberg
- Cinematography: James Miller
- Edited by: Philip Shane; Justin Weinstein
- Music by: Joel Goodman
- Distributed by: Submarine Deluxe
- Release dates: January 14, 2011 (Sundance); October 21, 2011 (United States)
- Running time: 77 minutes
- Country: United States
- Language: English
- Box office: $310,832

Being Elmo: A Puppeteer's Journey is a 2011 American documentary film about Kevin Clash, the puppeteer behind the Sesame Street character Elmo who became a rising star and created a global sensation. “Being Elmo: A Puppeteer’s Journey” was one of the most talked about documentaries coming out of the 2011 Sundance Film Festival.

== Synopsis ==
The film chronicles the journey of puppeteer Kevin Clash, the unlikely voice and mastermind behind Elmo. Focusing on Clash's childhood dreams and early career in Baltimore, Maryland; it covers his first meeting and relationship with Sesame Street creator Jim Henson, puppet maker Kermit Love, and documents his journey to success.

Sesame Street camera man James Miller originally filmed Kevin Clash with Elmo looking at photos of Miller's 2 year-old daughter. After showing the footage to Constance Marks, she started thinking maybe this would be a good documentary, seeing the performer behind the muppet. They brought the idea to Kevin Clash who thought it was a great opportunity to talk about the work he loves.

== Participants ==
- Whoopi Goldberg - Narrator
- Kevin Clash - Himself
- George Clash - Himself (Kevin's Father)
- Gladys Clash - Herself (Kevin's Mother)
- Bill Barretta - Himself
- Martin P. Robinson - Himself
- Tau Bennett - Himself
- Fran Brill - Herself
- Joan Ganz Cooney - Herself (Co-Founder Sesame Workshop)
- Cheryl Henson - Herself (President, Jim Henson Foundation)
- Jim Henson - Himself (archive footage)
- Caroll Spinney - Himself (archive footage)
- Frank Oz - Himself (archive footage)
- Jack Black - Himself (archive footage)
- Hugh Jackman - Himself (archive footage)
- Oprah Winfrey - Herself (archive footage)
- Arsenio Hall - Himself (archive footage)
- Kermit Love - Himself (archive footage)
- Michelle Obama - Herself (archive footage)
- Martha Stewart - Herself (archive footage)
- Dick Cavett - Himself (archive footage)
- Ricky Gervais - Himself (archive footage)
- Kathie Lee Gifford - Herself (archive footage)
- Rosie O'Donnell - Herself (archive footage)
- Regis Philbin - Himself (archive footage)
- Rove McManus - Himself (archive footage)
- Kofi Annan - Himself (archive footage)
- Emilio Delgado - Himself (archive footage)
- Richard Hunt - Himself (archive footage)
- Peter Jennings - Himself (archive footage)
- Robert Keeshan - Himself (archive footage)
- Stu Kerr - Himself (archive footage)
- Will Lee - Himself (archive footage)
- LL Cool J - Himself (archive footage)
- Sonia Manzano - Herself (archive footage)
- Bob McGrath - Himself (archive footage)
- Jerry Nelson - Himself (archive footage)
- Roscoe Orman - Himself (archive footage)
- Matt Robinson - Himself (archive footage)
- Don Sahlin - Himself (archive footage)
- Steve Whitmire - Himself (archive footage)
- Princess Diana - Herself (archive footage)

== Release ==
The film premiered at the 2011 Sundance Film Festival and was a Grand Jury Prize nominee, but went on to win the Special Jury Prize. The Hollywood Reporter's Sundance Review for the film stated, "Being Elmo is a rare documentary that will connect across generations and cultures to delight viewers worldwide for years to come."

== Reception ==
Rotten Tomatoes gives the film a score of 95% based on reviews from 78 critics. The film received warm-hearted reviews by critics when it was released.

Roger Ebert noted "We...learn a lot of the tricks behind giving the muppets such distinctive personality." The New York Post reported: "One of the chief pleasures of Sundance [Film Festival] is wandering into a movie that you think couldn't possibly amount to anything much and being knocked out by it. The documentary 'Being Elmo: A Puppeteer's Journey,' which should make Kevin Clash a household name, is an inspiring and joyous celebration of art, skill, determination and making kids happy... Clash is a remarkable talent, a true master of his field, and the importance of what he does is considerable. Sick children apparently have asked to meet Elmo as their dying wish. If you can watch one such encounter without crying, you're a stronger man than I. Clash, pro that he is, doesn't cry. Because where there is Elmo, there must be happiness." Look at OKC praised: "As director Constance Marks proves in her detailed and surprisingly emotional documentary Being Elmo: A Puppeteer's Journey, Clash's love of the art form eventually led him to create one of the most popular characters in children's television."
