= Thomas Kerr =

Thomas Kerr may refer to:

- Thomas Kerr of Ferniehirst (died 1585) Scottish landowner
- Thomas Kerr (illustrator) (born 1962), Canadian illustrator
- Thomas Kerr (Kentucky politician) (born 1950), American politician and state legislator in Kentucky
- Tom Kerr, British comic strip artist
- Tom Kerr (politician) (1887–1956), member of the Queensland Legislative Assembly
- Stu Kerr (Thomas Stewart Kerr, 1928–1994), American television personality
- T. Michael Kerr (born 1962), Assistant Secretary for Administration and Management at the U.S. Department of Labor
- Thomas Kerr (writer and songwriter), Tyneside writer, journalist and songwriter of the middle and late 19th century
- Thomas Kerr (engineer) (1924–2004), British aerospace engineer
- Thomas R. Kerr (1843–1926), Irish-born Medal of Honor recipient for the American Civil War
- Thomas Kerr (governor), governor of the Falkland Islands
- Thomas Kerr (Scottish politician) (born 1996), Scottish politician

== See also ==
- Thomas Kerr Fairless (1825–1853), English landscape-painter
