= Fairless Local School District =

School district in Ohio

Address
- 800 7th St SE Brewster, Ohio, 44613; United States

District information
- Type: Public
- Motto: "Building the Future One Child at a Time!"
- Grades: PK–12
- President: Jody Seward
- Vice-president: Hope Hill
- Superintendent: Micheal Hearn
- Schools: 3
- Budget: $11 million
- NCES District ID: 3904984

Students and staff
- Enrollment: 1,233 (2024–25)
- Faculty: 84.40
- Staff: 223.10
- Student–teacher ratio: 14.61
- District mascot: Falcon
- Colors: Navy blue, silver, and white

Other information
- Website: www.fairlesslocalschools.org

The Fairless Local School District is a public school district in Stark County, Ohio, United States. The district covers 100 square miles (260 km^{2}) in southwestern Stark County and serves students south of Massillon including the villages of Beach City, Brewster, Navarre, and Wilmot, and the townships of Sugar Creek and Bethlehem. As of the 2024–25 school year, Fairless Elementary School houses 613 students in grades Pre-K through 5, Fairless Middle School for grades 6–8 houses 293 students, and Fairless High School is home to 327 students in grades 9 through 12.

== Schools ==
The district operates three schools, all located along Navarre Road in Sugar Creek Township, just southeast of Brewster and approximately 3 miles (4.8 km) southwest of Navarre. District administrative offices are located inside Fairless High School.

- Fairless Elementary School
  - Grades K–5
  - Opened September 10, 2007
- Fairless Middle School
  - Grades 6–8
  - Opened September 10, 2007
- Fairless High School
  - Grades 9–12
  - Completed and opened August 2023

== Historical schools ==
- Navarre Elementary School, Navarre. Demolished.
- Brewster Elementary School, Brewster. Demolished.
- Beach City Elementary School, Beach City. Demolished.
- Wilmot Elementary School, Wilmot. Building now owned by Faith Christian Academy.
- Fairless High School (former), Navarre. Demolished.

== Flag ==
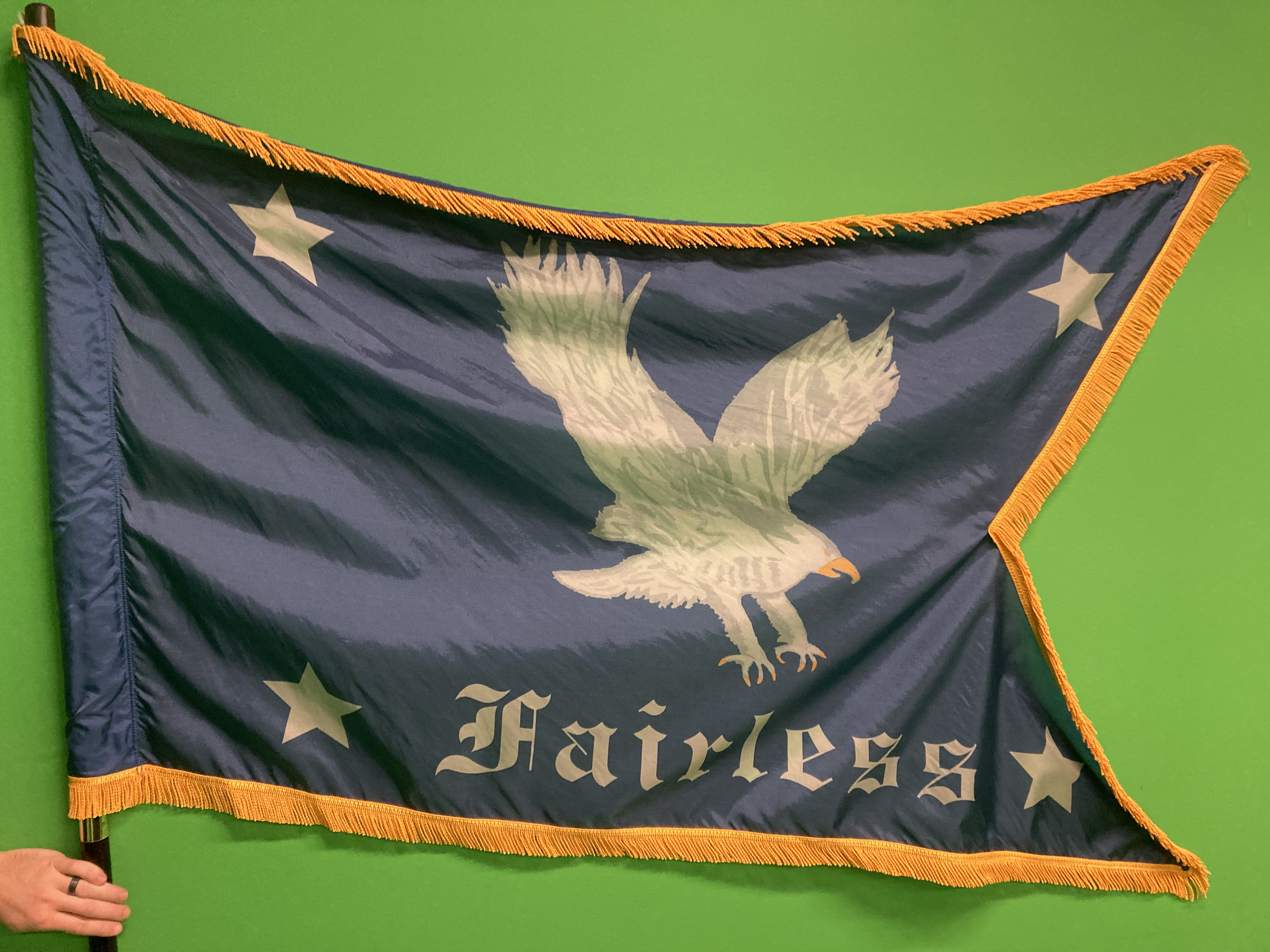
The main flag of the FLSD

The school has a flag that consists of a navy blue swallowtail with four silver stars in each corner, in the center is a silver falcon with text underneath that reads "Fairless". There is a sports variant which consists of a "Flying F" on a navy blue background.
