= Call It Macaroni =

American children's television series

Call It Macaroni is an American children's television series that premiered on January 24, 1975. It was produced by Group W (Westinghouse Broadcasting Company, Inc.) with executive producers Gail Frank and Stephanie Meagher. Prior to its release, Donald McGannon, the chair of Group W, announced the show was a call to action for children to have a specific slot for their television. Intended to be a 12-part series of children's specials to be aired once a month, due to its popularity, another 12 specials were produced.

Its goal was to show 10–12-year-olds different things they could experience in the United States. It follows a different group of children each episode as they go to different places within the country, learning about a culture, city, environment, job, or hobby.

The first season was sold to 100, 103 or 104 stations in syndication. It was well received and won a Peabody Award in 1975.

== Episodes ==
There are 24 half-hour episodes of Call it Macaroni. Air dates listed below may be later than the first airing. One episode, "Gym Dandys", is viewable on YouTube.

Episode	Air date	Synopsis
It's a Long Way Up	January 24, 1975	Three teens climb Mount Hood in Oregon.
Give the Circus a Tumble	February 19, 1975	Three 11-year-olds spend a week with Circus Vargas as it tours and performs in Colorado.
Fly like a Bird	March 19, 1975	Two San Franciscans take glider and hang gliding lessons.
Once Upon a Horse	April 20, 1975	Two 12-year-olds get horse riding lessons and participate in a riding competition.
Sail on the Winds of Time	April 24, 1975	Teens learn aboard a replica of a 19th century schooner.
Texas Tenderfoot	May 30, 1975	Three teens from the San Francisco Bay region become wranglers, helping to drive horses from Big Bend National Park in West Texas to a ranch 60 miles (97 km) away.
Exploring Yesterday	June 6, 1975	Three children get to experience how the Native Americans of northern Minnesota lived.
A Seaful of Adventure	July 22, 1975	Three youngsters from the Boston area take a cruise on the Florida shrimp boat Lady Gin.
The Boys and Girls of Summer	September 4, 1975	A boy and a girl from Philadelphia go to the Philadelphia Phillies spring training camp in Florida.
Path of Papagos	November 16, 1975	Three youngsters experience the Native American way of life.
Puppets and Other People	December 6, 1975	Three children from Boston construct a puppet under the supervision of puppeteer Kermit Love. Kevin Clash, the best known puppeteer to perform as Sesame Street's Elmo, saw this episode as a teen and asked his mother to help him contact Love; she succeeded, and Love eventually became his mentor.
Where Do we Sign Up, When Do We Leave?	December 15, 1975	Three kids from the San Francisco area spend a week on a racing schooner exploring the Channel Islands of California.
Nashville: Over the Rainbow	April 18, 1976	In the first episode of the second year, a 13-year-old Dobro guitar player goes to Nashville and gets to perform with Bobby Bare.
Lights, Camels, Action	May 21, 1976	Three New Yorkers join a production company working on the film Hawmps!, a comedy about the United States Camel Corps, on location in Arizona and become extras in one scene.
And That's Jazz	June 11, 1976	Two budding musicians from New York go to New Orleans and join a jazz session.
Rogue Runners	July 23, 1976	Some youngsters go on a five-day rafting trip on the Rogue River.
Some of My Best Friends are Dolphins	August 20, 1976	Two children work with dolphins at the Miami Seaquarium.
It's Really Magic	September 21, 1976	Two 11-year-olds from New York travel to Hollywood to work with the magician Shimada and perform at the Magic Castle.
How Do You Make a Moose Smile?	October 1, 1976	Three New York 11- and 12-year-olds are taught by a professional how to photograph wildlife in the wilderness.
North of the Arctic	December 4, 1976	Two youngsters from Portland, Oregon, become acquainted with an Eskimo family in Alaska.
Dance to the Music	December 5, 1976	Two teens spend a week at the Alvin Ailey American Dance Theater in New York.
When Bold Knights Lanced	January 10, 1977	A boy and a girl attend the annual Medieval Festival at Fort Tryon Park in Manhattan.
Gym Dandys	February 11, 1977	Two kids from San Francisco receive lessons from gymnasts training for the 1980 Summer Olympics in Moscow.
Sing, West Virginia, Sing	March 15, 1977	Two young Philadelphians learn about the music and culture of Appalachia.
