= The Puzzle Place =

Children's television series

- Genre: Children's television series
- Created by: Cecily Truett; Suzanne Singer; Rob Stork; Ellis Weiner; David Yazbek
- Starring: Alice Dinnean; Carmen Osbahr; Jim Martin; Noel MacNeal; Eric Jacobson; Peter Linz; Matt Vogel; Drew Massey; Alison Mork; Stephanie D'Abruzzo; Terri Hardin; Allan Trautman
- Theme music composer: Steve Horelick; Janet Weir
- Opening theme: "We're Going to The Puzzle Place"
- Ending theme: "We're Going to The Puzzle Place" (instrumental)
- Composers: Steve Horelick; Janet Weir
- Country of origin: United States
- Original language: English
- No. of seasons: 3
- No. of episodes: 75

Production
- Executive producers: Cecily Truett; Larry Lancit; Stephen Kulczycki (seasons 1–2); Patricia Kunkel (season 3)
- Producers: Suzanne Singer (season 1); Marijane Miller (season 2); Ellis Weiner (season 3)
- Camera setup: Videotape; Multi-camera
- Running time: 30 minutes
- Production companies: KCET (Note: Credited as KCET Los Angeles during Seasons 1–2 and KCET Hollywood during Season 3 and reruns.); Lancit Media Entertainment

Original release
- Network: PBS
- Release: January 16, 1995 – December 4, 1998

The Puzzle Place is an American children's television series produced by KCET in Los Angeles and Lancit Media in New York City. Although production was dated and premiered on two Los Angeles PBS stations, KCET and KLCS, on September 15, 1994, it did not officially premiere on all PBS stations nationwide until January 16, 1995, with its final episode airing on December 4, 1998.

The Puzzle Place was funded in part by the now defunct Corporation for Public Broadcasting, public television viewers like you, and corporate grants from Edison International, Chef Boyardee (through its Chef Jr. brand,) and IBM.

== Premise ==
The series follows a multi-ethnic group of children (puppets) from different parts of the United States who gather and socialize at a special kids' hangout area known as the Puzzle Place. In each episode, the characters are confronted with an everyday conflict usually encountered in childhood years, such as making moral decisions, sharing, racism and sexism.

== Characters ==
=== Main ===
- Julie Woo (performed by Alice Dinnean) is a Chinese-American girl from San Francisco, California. She is very sensitive and caring of her personal possessions and sometimes tries a little too hard. She loves dancing and singing; although, outside of the show's musical numbers, her voice can have cacophonous to humorous effect.
- Kiki Flores (performed by Carmen Osbahr) is a Mexican-American girl from San Antonio, Texas. She is very outgoing and has a temper. She is bilingual and once pretended to be a space alien after being teased about her accent (episode: Accentuate the Positive). She is a great chili cook and has a Spanish-speaking cousin named Magdalena ("Hello Maggie") who helps everyone to learn about acceptance.
- Ben Olafson (performed by Jim Martin) is a European-American boy of German and Norwegian descent from a farm near Renner, South Dakota. His father is deceased ("Big Boys Don't Cry"). He is good at solving difficult puzzles and is also a talented dancer. Although normally easygoing and friendly, he can be unforgiving when angered.
- Leon MacNeal (performed by Noel MacNeal in seasons 1 and 2, with Eric Jacobson puppeteering to his voice in season 3) is an African-American boy, from New York City. He wears dreadlocks, is well-cultured and passionate, and is really good at balancing with a practical mind for when trying to find a solution to the problem. He is a jokester, and also loves basketball and hip-hop music.
- Skye Nakaiye (performed by Peter Linz in seasons 1 and 2, and Matt Vogel in season 3) is a Native American boy from the Fort Apache Indian Reservation in Arizona. He often wears a bandana, a yellow coat, and a feather necklace. He is naturally curious and believes in staying true to his values and culture. He also plays the guitar.
- Jody Silver (performed by Alison Mork in season 1, Stephanie D'Abruzzo in season 2, and Terri Hardin in season 3) is a Jewish-American girl from Cincinnati, Ohio. Her parents are divorced, with her mother living in New York City ("Rip van Wrinkle"). She does not like to be called names, and can be gullible but is rather enthusiastic. She is into art, especially drawing and painting.

=== Supporting ===
- Kyle O'Connor (initially performed by Drew Massey, and later puppeteered by Allan Trautman to Hardin's voice) is an Irish-American boy and wheelchair user who appears in some episodes.
- Weebus is the group's smart talking super-telecomputer that they use to communicate with people outside of the Puzzle Place. She is also capable of performing automated tasks and playing video clips to answer questions.
- Nuzzle (performed by Peter Linz in seasons 1 and 2 and Matt Vogel in season 3) and Sizzle (performed by Alice Dinnean) are the pet dog and cat, respectively, at the Puzzle Place. They are seen mostly in the basement, talking to each other, and acting as animals around the kids. They are usually involved in a subplot.
- The Piece Police are multicolored inhabitants of the Puzzle Place. They communicate amongst themselves using gibberish, although they understand English. It is hinted in some episodes that they all know what Sizzle and Nuzzle are saying. Originally performed by Osbahr, Martin, MacNeal, and Mork, with D'Abruzzo replacing Mork in season 2, and Jacobson and Hardin replacing MacNeal and D'Abruzzo in season 3. D'Abruzzo also provided their singing voices.

== Production ==
In 1991, the Corporation for Public Broadcasting granted 4.5 million dollars to KCET and Lancit Media to develop programs aimed to children between 2-6. They developed an idea of a multicultural, multi-ethnical puppet show with themes of self-esteem, respect and cooperation called "The Puzzle Factory". In order to receive the grant, the producers had to get $7 million in commitment; $3.5 came from Southern California Edison in partnership with Rebuild LA, in an effort to "heal the community" after the 1992 riots. The remainder of the money came with deals with toy factories and other merchandise manufacturers. To avoid copyright infringement, "The Puzzle Factory" changed name to "The Puzzle Works".

== Episodes ==
=== Pilot episodes ===
In early 1994, two pilot episodes were produced for the series known as The Puzzle Works. Eventually, the show was renamed The Puzzle Place shortly before its premiere months later.

=== Series overview ===
Season	Episodes	Originally released	
Season	Episodes	First released	Last released
1	40	January 16, 1995	March 10, 1995
2	25	January 15, 1996	February 16, 1996
3	10	October 19, 1998	December 4, 1998

=== Season 1 (1995) ===
No. overall	No. in series	Title	Original release date
1	1	"Tippy Woo"	January 16, 1995
Julie obtains a teddy bear, and names him after herself "Tippy Woo". She also remarks on some unflattering nicknames other kids have given her, per her last name "Woo". Featured song: "It's My Name", performed by Julie and the kids
2	2	"Train Driving Kids"	January 17, 1995
The boys have a model train but refuse to share with the girls, insisting it's a boys' activity. Gradually everyone takes to other suggested activities, leaving only Leon and Kiki still wanting to play with the model train. Nuzzle struggles to play a toy xylophone. Featured song: "I Can Do Anything", performed by the kids
3	3	"Rip Van Wrinkle"	January 18, 1995
Leon, Kiki, Julie and Skye host a slumber party, but have to work together to help each other's bedtime routines/needs be met, or else the "slumber" part will be difficult. Jody and Ben only make cameo appearances. Sizzle and Nuzzle try to be nocturnal, but it's harder than it seems. Featured song: "Kumbaya", performed by Vaneesa Thomas and the kids
4	4	"Accentuate the Positive"	January 19, 1995
Kiki dresses as a space alien, distressed that other kids at school laughed at her Hispanic accent. Featured song: "Small World", performed by Kiki and the kids
5	5	"Gotta Dance"	January 20, 1995
The kids obtain a sheet of dance steps and learn of various cultural dances while trying to decipher it. Sizzle recalls the time Nuzzle criticized her for carrying her tail wrong and refuses to dance with him again. Featured song: "Cha-Cha", performed by the kids Guest stars: Nia Peeples and Fred Kelly as themselves
6	6	"Rudy One"	January 23, 1995
A robot shows up at the Puzzle Place and befriends Leon, while insulting everyone else, in an attempt to sabotage everyone's friendship. Sizzle turns to Nuzzle for advice after a new cat calls her a "snooty patootie". Featured song: "You Can't Say That", performed by Rudy One and the kids
7	7	"Butterfingers"	January 24, 1995
The kids hold a relay race, but Ben drops his baton, prompting the nickname "Butterfingers" from everyone else. Nuzzle tries to show off his bravado by wanting to be called "Professor Muscles". Featured song: "I Believe in Me", performed by Ben Guest star: Mark Nizer as Ben's cousin Mark
8	8	"Rock Dreams"	January 25, 1995
Skye aspires to perform music, but is discouraged by the fact that he doesn't know very many Native American performers. Eventually he makes contact with Native American Robby Romero and his band, Red Thunder, who reassure him. Nuzzle gets so tired of watching Sizzle listen to Swiss yodeling music that he tries to make her yodel herself. Ben and Julie only make cameo appearances. Featured songs: "Born to Strum", "Stevie Wonder", and "Julio Iglesias", performed by Skye; "The Prayer Song", performed by Red Thunder Guest stars: Red Thunder as themselves
9	9	"Roamantics"	January 26, 1995
Ben brings in an ant farm to show everyone, but Leon unwittingly wreaks havoc in an attempt to give the ants fresh air, and has to make some sacrifices to restore order to The Puzzle Place. Nuzzle gets carried away with a roll of paper towel. Featured song: "Anticipate", performed by Leon
10	10	"Spud Buds"	January 27, 1995
Skye finds a party box in the kitchen, but everyone else is too distracted watching TV to take interest. Nuzzle wishes he hadn't let Sizzle use a flying machine all she wants. Featured song: "Changing Channels", performed by Skye and the kids Notes: Several of the puppet performers appear on-screen in live-action clips the kids watch on TV: Jim Martin and Alison Mork as paleontologists who meet a dinosaur; Peter Linz and Alice Dinnean as the stars of a cheap children's show; and Carmen Osbahr as a soap star.
11	11	"Different Drummer"	January 30, 1995
Julie plays referee to Skye and Leon's dispute over whose cultural drum is more significant. The two eventually agree that both drums are significant in their own way, and neither is necessarily better. Sizzle takes up skateboarding. Ben, Kiki and Jody only make cameo appearances. Featured song: "All the Different Drummers", performed by Skye and Leon
12	12	"I Love Kiki"	January 31, 1995
Kiki is at a loss as to what to do when she unwittingly "breaks" Julie's toy horse, and can't bring herself to tell her. Sizzle looks after the sneaker that Nuzzle likes to chew on, but when the Piece Police throw it out as she naps, she panics. Ben does not appear in this episode. Featured song: "I Think I'll Do It", performed by Kiki Guest star: Bree Walker as herself
13	13	"True Colors"	February 1, 1995
The kids all partner up to paint one another, but initially can't find a suitable paint color for everyone. Their second attempt, using chalk of different colors, is much more successful. Sizzle wants to paint a self-portrait, but it's too hard for her. Featured song: "Colors", performed by Steve Horelick Guest star: Anna Mason as herself
14	14	"Cute Is as Cute Does"	February 2, 1995
Julie wants to emulate her favorite singer, Penny Candy, but sees her true colors when a crisis in the greenhouse hits. Nuzzle bores Sizzle to sleep when he tries to show her a photo album of when he was a puppy. Leon and Ben only make cameo appearances. Featured song: "C.U.T.E. Cute", (Note: Referred to in the episode as "And I'm Cute to Boot", but listed in the credits as "C.U.T.E. Cute.") performed by Amy Hill as Penny Candy Guest star: Amy Hill as Penny Candy
15	15	"Leon's Pizza"	February 3, 1995
Leon wants to make a pizza for everyone, but he needs a creative solution to satisfy everyone's different topping preferences. Sizzle and Nuzzle fight over which toy is better. Featured song: "Pizza", performed by the kids
16	16	"Real Heroes"	February 6, 1995
The kids compare their favorite superheroes but need to band together when the pets get caught in a dangerous situation. Featured song: "My Hero", performed by the kids Guest star: Robert Townsend
17	17	"Going by the Book"	February 7, 1995
The kids want to play Sleeping Beauty, but as four of them don't fit the description of the protagonists, they research other princes and princesses that reflect their individual heritages. Featured song: "No One Can Be It Like You", performed by the kids
18	18	"Mad Music Magic"	February 8, 1995
Kiki leads the kids in a makeshift band, but her authority seems to do more harm than good when she won't allow them to play their preferred instruments. Sizzle attends her cousin's birthday party, so Nuzzle tries to be the dog and the cat at the same time. Featured song: "I Can Sing", performed by Kiki Guest stars: Walter Turnbull and Boys Choir of Harlem
19	19	"Party of One"	February 9, 1995
Leon learns a hard lesson in racism when he's barred from attending a friend's birthday party simply because he's African-American. Nuzzle refuses to fetch a stick for Kiki because she didn't say "the magic word" (which Sizzle tries in vain to guess). Featured song: "A Lot Like Me", performed by Leon and the kids
20	20	"Dancing Dragon"	February 10, 1995
Skye and Kiki unwittingly invade Julie's privacy by opening a package meant for her. Nuzzle and Sizzle cause some mischief with it. Featured song: "Dancing Dragon", performed by the kids
21	21	"Picture Perfect"	February 13, 1995
Ben is unwilling to wear his glasses for a group picture because of some teasing, but unwittingly wreaks havoc when he spends a day without them. Nuzzle goes for a "hip cat" approach, which fails to impress Sizzle. Featured song: "My Glasses", performed by Steve Horelick
22	22	"Maiden Voyages"	February 14, 1995
While the others turn the basement into a moonwalk with many balloons, Kiki and Julie enjoy moon cakes, but a humorous misunderstanding may mean Julie will marry Leon. Featured song: "You for Me, Me for You", performed by Carmen Cuesta and Porter Carroll Jr.
23	23	"Donuts and Dithering"	February 15, 1995
The kids receive six assorted donuts, and Jody gets first dibs, but she struggles to decide which one she wants. Leon attempts to manipulate her choice to keep her from picking the one he wants, but it backfires. Sizzle and Nuzzle so badly want to take a donut themselves.
24	24	"Bully for Jody"	February 16, 1995
Jody is a victim of bullying when a bigger student keeps stealing her lunch. Sizzle also tries to keep away a bigger cat. Featured song: "Friends", performed by the kids Guest stars: Sinbad as himself, Ben Ryan Ganger as the bully
25	25	"Ben's Bad Hair Day"	February 17, 1995
Ben attempts to change his "boring" hairstyle with disastrous results, before learning that his hair was fine the way it was. Featured song: "Hair", performed by Ben, Jody, Julie and Kiki
26	26	"All Weather Friends"	February 20, 1995
When a storm hits the Puzzle Place, Leon is embarrassed to admit he is afraid of thunder and lightning. Featured song: "Children of the Earth", performed by Skye and the kids
27	27	"Bread and Matzoh"	February 21, 1995
Skye brings some special bread from his tribe to share with the kids but is troubled when Jody refuses to try any for eight days. It turns out the reason is because of one of her own Jewish customs. Sizzle and Nuzzle get very hungry because the kids forget to feed them. Featured song: "The Bread Song", performed by Vaneese Thomas with reprise performed by the kids
28	28	"Owning It"	February 22, 1995
Leon obtains a new watch but drives everyone else crazy with it, causing them to snap back at him. Kiki is preparing chili in the kitchen, and Sizzle and Nuzzle want to taste it so badly. Guest star: Paula Poundstone
29	29	"Baffled Ben"	February 23, 1995
Ben is struggling to put together a puzzle but angrily snaps and puts down anyone who tries to help him. He also insults Skye's special plant, which grows when complimented, but shrinks when put down. Featured song: "Saying Something Nice", performed by Ben and the kids
30	30	"Practice Makes Perfect"	February 24, 1995
While nearly all the kids are sick with chickenpox, Skye finds a guitar and wants to play it, but he is slow to understand that he has to put time and effort into becoming good at it. Sizzle tries playing billiards. Ben and Julie only make cameo appearances. Featured song: "Keep on Trying", performed by Porter Carroll, Jr. Guest stars: Los Camperos de Nati Cano as themselves
31	31	"Finders Keepers"	February 27, 1995
Julie finds Skye's misplaced Apache pollen pouch and is so enamored with it that she doesn't return it right away, causing Skye to feel angry with Julie for not returning it to him right away. Jody does not appear in this episode, and Ben only makes a cameo appearance. Featured song: "The Sacred Ways of My People", performed by Skye Note: Part of this episode appeared on the video Kids for Character to illustrate trustworthiness.
32	32	"You Say Potato"	February 28, 1995
The kids bring in items for a picnic, but can't seem to agree on where to have it. While Leon and Jody are content to go anywhere, Skye and Julie prefer the mountains and Ben and Kiki prefer the park. Even the two duos can't agree on the specifics. Sizzle and Nuzzle are excited to go on the picnic themselves, especially for bird-watching. Featured song: "Picnic", performed by the kids
33	33	"At the End of Our Rope"	March 1, 1995
The boys challenge the girls to a game of tug of war but are unexpectedly defeated and can't figure out why.
34	34	"Just Kidding"	March 2, 1995
The others tease Skye when he forgets to bring a bat to a baseball game, prompting Skye to get upset and leave. Ben feels badly about their teasing, even though they were just joking, and eventually convinces the others that they were wrong to do so. Sizzle and Nuzzle climb up a tree in the greenhouse but are too scared to come down. Leon and Kiki only make cameo appearances. Featured song: "I'm Glad I'm with You", performed by Sizzle and Nuzzle
35	35	"Everything in Its Place"	March 3, 1995
Kiki makes plans to clean the place, but it doesn't go as planned. Featured song: "Do It Right", performed by the kids
36	36	"Big Boys Don't Cry"	March 6, 1995
Leon gets upset and cries when the others exclude him from his own pancake making recipe and is labelled a "crybaby" by Ben and Skye. Julie convinces the two that they've had reason to cry in the past. Sizzle and Nuzzle filch all the pancakes made, and get sick from doing so. Featured song: "Let Them Show", performed by Porter Carroll Jr.
37	37	"Here's to the Winners"	March 7, 1995
Ben becomes discouraged when everyone but him has won a trophy for something, even though he does have an impressive skill that's worthy of a prize in and of itself, singlehandedly raising a pig. Sizzle and Nuzzle do not appear in this episode. Skye and Julie only make cameo appearances. Featured song: "Ben the Winner", performed by Ben Guest star: Justin Lord as Leon's dad
38	38	"A World of Difference"	March 8, 1995
Everyone except Skye disguise themselves as identical superheroes, but Skye can use each one's individual quirks to tell who is who. Featured song: "One of a Kind", performed by Skye, Nuzzle, Sizzle, and the kids Guest star: Eartha Kitt as narrator
39	39	"Willing and Able"	March 9, 1995
Ben takes pity on Skye's friend Kyle, who's in a wheelchair. Sizzle and Nuzzle find out the hard way that she can't bury a bone and he can't climb a tree. Leon and Kiki only make cameo appearances. Featured song: "We're All the Same", performed by the kids and Kyle Guest performer: Drew Massey as Kyle
40	40	"It's Magic"	March 10, 1995
Kiki becomes scared when her friends disappear after a failed magic act. Nuzzle becomes inspired by a heroic dog on TV. Featured song: "On My Own", performed by Kiki

=== Season 2 (1996) ===
No. overall	No. in series	Title	Original release date
41	1	"Deck the Halls"	January 15, 1996
The kids prepare for Christmas but Ben is shocked that Jody does not celebrate Christmas with them. Featured songs: "Holiday Lights", performed by the kids; "Jingle Bells", performed by Patti LaBelle Guest star: Patti LaBelle as herself
42	2	"Dressing Up Is Hard to Do"	January 16, 1996
Julie criticizes what Jody wants to wear to the "grown-up" theme party at Puzzle Place. But when the others kids like Jody's outfit better than hers, Julie learns that the only reason you need for wearing something is because you like it. Featured song: "It's You", performed by the kids
43	3	"One Way"	January 17, 1996
Skye and Leon find out that there are many ways to make kites and that just because one way works doesn't mean another way won't work just as well. Sizzle attempts playing basketball. Julie and Ben do not appear in this episode. Featured song: "Each in Our Own Way", performed by Kiki, Leon, Skye and Jody
44	4	"Oldies But Goodies"	January 18, 1996
Julie is torn between spending the day with her grandmother or singing in the talent show. Skye and Jody do not appear in this episode.
45	5	"Helping Hands"	January 19, 1996
Kiki decides to prune a big tree by herself and becomes exasperated when she discovers that the job is too much for her to do alone. She learns that it's okay to ask for help when you need it. Nuzzle obtains a motorcycle and Sizzle so badly wants to try it herself. Julie, Ben and Leon do not appear in this episode. Featured song: "Just Call My Name", performed by Jody, Kiki, Kyle, Sizzle and Nuzzle Guest performers: Allan Trautman (puppeteer) and Terri Hardin (voice) as Kyle
46	6	"Yellow Belt"	January 22, 1996
When Ben teases Jody that girls can't learn martial arts, she quickly teaches him a lesson.
47	7	"The Mystery of the Fabulous Hat"	January 23, 1996
Leon learns that playing Sherlock Holmes isn't enough to solve a mystery. He needs Dr. Watson, his teammate Ben. Everyone learns that being part of a team means respecting your teammates and appreciating their unique contributions. Sizzle and Nuzzle steal the fabulous hat in question and destroy it. Julie and Skye do not appear in this episode. Featured song: "Two Heads Are Better Than One", performed by Leon and Ben Guest star: Lynne Thigpen as The Chief
48	8	"How Much Is That Doggie in the Window?"	January 24, 1996
Kiki tries to prove to her mother that she's ready to take care of a pet by taking care of Nuzzle. She soon realizes that she's not ready for the responsibility. Sizzle so badly wants to climb a curtain in the basement but keeps falling down. Julie and Skye do not appear in this episode. Featured song: "Doggone Shame" performed by Nuzzle and Sizzle Guest star: Elda Lopez as Kiki's mom
49	9	"The New Adventures of Julie Woo"	January 25, 1996
Julie tries out a new and different game and realizes how much fun it can be. Nuzzle takes up the Scottish bagpipes and tries to get Sizzle to play too, all the while annoying her by calling her "lassie". Kiki and Leon do not appear in this episode. Featured song: "Into the New", performed by Julie
50	10	"We Three Kings"	January 26, 1996
When Leon's uncle tells him he's the "king of kids", Leon suddenly gets an ego boost and acts royally around The Puzzle Place, making Skye and Ben his subjects. Eventually, pro-basketball player Cedric Ceballos tells them that there is a difference between being bossy and being a leader. Sizzle suddenly decides to be "queen of cats" and makes Nuzzle do everything for her. Featured song: "If I Were King", performed by Leon and the kids Guest stars: James Black as Leon's Uncle Ray, Cedric Ceballos as himself
51	11	"Hello, Maggie"	January 29, 1996
Kiki's cousin Maggie visits from Mexico. Even though she only speaks Spanish, the other kids learn that friendship and communication can develop through gestures and a few simple words. Nuzzle gets trapped in a dollhouse. Leon and Jody do not appear in this episode. Featured song: "Friendship Is a Garden", performed by Skye and Maggie Note: Carmen Osbahr performs Maggie.
52	12	"Off the Track"	January 30, 1996
Ben and Leon fight over who gets to lay the last piece of train track. They get so angry that they hit each other and their fight ruins the game for everyone, including themselves. Once they realize that fighting is a bad idea, they learn what else they can do when they feel so angry that they want to hit someone. A replay of their fight shows them points where they could have stopped to talk things out. Kiki and Jody do not appear in this episode. Guest star: Ernie Hudson
53	13	"Beautiful Doll"	January 31, 1996
Unbeknownst to Julie, Nuzzle has taken her favorite doll. Julie is understandably upset, so Leon decides to conduct an all-out search. Ben and Skye do not appear in this episode. Featured song: "You're My Doll", performed by Julie, Kiki, Leon and Jody
54	14	"Tattle Tales"	February 1, 1996
Leon sees his brother accidentally break his father's favorite lamp. Leon doesn't want to be a tattletale, but he doesn't want to lie either. When he learns that telling the truth is not the same as tattling, he knows just what to do.
55	15	"Those Ears, Those Eyes"	February 2, 1996
Julie is upset because a classmate calls her eyes "funny". Her friends help her see that everyone's eyes are different and beautiful, and that they are all just right for them. Nuzzle imagines what it would be like to have different kinds of ears. Skye and Jody do not appear in this episode. Featured song: "Lookin' at You" performed by Steve Horelick and Janet Weir Guest star: Rosalind Chao as herself, Bluejean Ashley Secrist as Linda
56	16	"That's Weird"	February 5, 1996
The children think Ben's Norwegian dancing and traditional costumes are weird. They soon learn that things that are new to them just might be interesting, not weird. Sizzle, likewise, finds Nuzzle chewing on a toy car weird. Skye and Jody do not appear in this episode. Note: This episode does not feature an original song.
57	17	"The Ballad of Davy Cricket"	February 6, 1996
When Jody's pet cricket dies, the friends share how different cultures deal with death. Children learn what to do with all the strong feelings that come up when someone (or something) they love dies. They find answers in the traditional practices of their culture, their families, and their friends. Nuzzle is so excited to see his favorite dog groomer that Sizzle couldn't care less. Ben and Skye do not appear in this episode. Featured song: "When I Think of You", performed by Jody and the kids Guest star: Martin Grey as Jody's dad
58	18	"Little Leon, Big Ben"	February 7, 1996
The children decide to host a circus. But Leon is too small to fit into a costume. With his friends' help, he discovers that size shouldn't matter. Featured song: "I'm Me" performed by Ben and Leon Guest stars: Jason Alexander Carter as Kid #2, Andrew Grandfield as Kid #1
59	19	"I Scream, You Scream"	February 8, 1996
Jody and the kids learn that dealing with a difficult situation is easier when you're able to talk about your feelings, especially with issues like divorce and remarriage. Sizzle and Nuzzle think of ways to organize the basement. Julie and Ben do not appear in this episode. Featured song: "Can We Talk", performed by Jody; Guest stars: Susan Angelo as Debbie, Martin Grey as Jody's dad, Lyndon Mosse as a waiter Note: Noel MacNeal appears on screen as a French waiter.
60	20	"Skye's Coat"	February 9, 1996
Everyone has a new raincoat except Skye. The kids convince him that he can make his raincoat special by decorating it in his own way. Kiki and Ben do not appear in this episode. Featured song: "In the Rain", performed by Skye Guest star: Brendon Clark as Kid #1, Anthony Hernandez as Kid #2, Celia Xavier as Skye's mom
61	21	"It's Mine"	February 12, 1996
Julie and Kiki want to play with the same thing at the same time. With the help of Skye's Uncle Victorio, a member of the Tribunal Council, they learn that the best way to solve a conflict is to make a rule that everyone agrees to follow. The kids brainstorm lots of ideas before they finally find a rule that everyone thinks will work. Sizzle and Nuzzle fight over napping spots. Ben and Jody do not appear in this episode. Featured song: "Find Another Way", performed by Julie, Kiki, Leon and Skye Guest star: Miguel Najera as Skye's Uncle Victorio
62	22	"One Big, Happy Family"	February 13, 1996
Ben, Skye, and Julie cheer up Jody after a boy makes fun of her nontraditional family.
63	23	"Leon Grows Up"	February 14, 1996
Leon wants to be a grownup because he thinks grownups can do whatever they want. When he realizes that there are lots of things grownups have to do that kids don't have to worry about, he decides he can wait. Sizzle wears a new sweater that makes her sneeze, and Nuzzle thinks he can be a doctor to her. Julie and Skye do not appear in this episode. Featured song: "When I'm a Grownup", performed by Leon and the kids Guest star: T.C. Carson as himself
64	24	"Cowpokes"	February 15, 1996
Julie and Leon are scared of something they've never tried: horseback riding. They find out that when you have the courage to try new things you end up being proud of yourself. Ben and Jody do not appear in this episode. Featured song: "Cowboy Way", performed by Julie, Kiki, Leon and Skye
65	25	"Hurricane Julie"	February 16, 1996
When Julie sees that her excitement about playing in the wading pool is actually hurting people (and pets), she understands that it is important to be careful. Skye and Jody do not appear in this episode. Featured song: "Be Cool", performed by Ben, Kiki, Julie and Leon

=== Season 3 (1998) ===
No. overall	No. in series	Title	Original release date
66	1	"Family Fun"	October 19, 1998
On family photo day, the gang learns about diverse types of families. Nuzzle and Sizzle see a single-parent family, a grandparent-led family, and an adoptive family. Guest star: Lauren Tom as Julie's mom
67	2	"Anything She Can Do"	October 20, 1998
Julie is upset because her mother gives so much attention to her baby sister, Helen. Nuzzle is suspicious of the newly installed pet door. Guest star: Lauren Tom as Julie's mom
68	3	"You Don't Match"	October 21, 1998
Ben's lack of exposure to diversity causes him to assume that Tim can't be Leon's cousin because Tim is too fair-skinned. When he learns he is wrong, Ben's openness in accepting his mistake helps his view of the world grow as he discovers that even people who are the same race have different colors of skin. Meanwhile, Nuzzle develops a stomachache after eating Sizzle's food. Julie, Kiki and Skye do not appear in this episode. Featured song: "Dance, Dance, Dance" performed by Steve Horelick and Janet Weir Guest star: Bryton McClure as Cousin Tim
69	4	"To Have and Have Not"	October 26, 1998
Skye worries that the others won't play with him because his parents refuse to buy an expensive new toy. Nuzzle fakes an injury to get sympathy.
70	5	"Fiesta Follies"	October 27, 1998
The gang wants to throw Kiki a birthday party, but they learn that she likes different things than they do. Meanwhile, Sizzle becomes a Mexican heartthrob's biggest fan.
71	6	"Between You and Me"	October 28, 1998
Skye refuses to let Leon wear his Apache necklace, and Leon gets upset. When the kids hide Nuzzle and Sizzle's favorite toys, they search everywhere to find them.
72	7	"A Star Is Burned"	October 29, 1998
Skye is directing the kids' production of Rapunzel. Julie gets mad when he praises co-star Ben, so she hits him to get a piece of her mind. Kiki and Jody do not appear in this episode. Featured song: "I'm a Star" performed by Skye, Ben, and Julie
73	8	"Spooky"	October 30, 1998
Skye and Ben exclude Kiki and Julie from their Count Spookula club because they don't think girls like spooky stuff, but they learn that some girls do like scary stuff, and some boys don't. Leon and Jody do not appear in this episode. Featured song: "Scary Stories", performed by Julie, Kiki, Ben and Skye Guest stars: Tommy Koenig as Count Spookula, Cathy Ladman as Doris Spookula
74	9	"Up!"	December 3, 1998
Julie and Ben are surprised by Kyle's new activity of rock climbing. They incorrectly assume that people who use wheelchairs can't do something physically challenging, like climbing rocks. They soon become Kyle's biggest supporters, though.
75	10	"I'm Talking to You"	December 4, 1998
Skye is ignored when he asks to use a video game, so he assumes the girl is being mean. Then he discovers that she didn't hear him because she is deaf. After he learns some sign language, he realizes he has found a new friend. Nuzzle gets interrupted from his nap by Sizzle trying to catch a butterfly. Julie, Ben, and Jody do not appear in this episode. Guest star: Marlee Matlin as herself, Marlo Lovitch, Sheena McFeely Note: This episode does not feature an original song.

== Broadcast ==
Reruns aired until March 31, 2000, when the show was replaced by Between the Lions on the schedule lineup. It became one of PBS Kids' most popular series on the line-up since Sesame Street. Besides the PBS stations in the United States, the series also aired on TV Cultura in Brazil, Discovery Kids in Latin America, RTP in Portugal, Israeli Educational Television in Israel, Fox Kids in Scandinavia, Kids Station in Japan, Channel 5 in the UK, and ABC Kids in Australia.

== Home media ==
During its launch, Sony Wonder released The Puzzle Place on VHS.

- Tuned In (10. Spud Buds and 14. Cute is as Cute Does)
- Rock Dreams (18. Mad Music Magic and 8. Rock Dreams)
- Rip Van Wrinkle (17. Going by the Book and 3. Rip Van Wrinkle)
- Accentuate the Positive (6. Rudy One and 4. Accentuate the Positive)
- Deck The Halls
- Sing-Along Songs

== Reception ==
In the weeks after its debut, The Puzzle Place won a great deal of acclaim and "enjoyed an average audience-per-viewing second only to Barney and Friends among shows in the popular PBS daily children's block". It received a citation of excellence from UNIMA-USA for its use of puppetry. In 1997, ten more episodes of the show were "in the works". Toys "R" Us, Sears, and Payless ShoeSource all announced that they would carry merchandising from the series and showcase that merchandise in its own separate "boutique" rather than integrating it with the other products.

== See also ==
- Arthur
- Barney & Friends
- Sesame Street
- Dragon Tales
- Between the Lions
- Clifford the Big Red Dog
- Lamb Chop's Play-Along
- The Magic School Bus
- Kidsongs
- Wishbone
