= Brewster Dairy =

American cheesemaker

Brewster Dairy is the largest manufacturer of "All natural" Swiss cheese in the U.S. and it is headquartered in Brewster, Ohio. The company has production facilities in Brewster, Ohio, as well as Stockton, Illinois and Rupert, Idaho. It manufactures approximately 85 million pounds of Swiss cheese annually from its three separate production facilities combined. While other companies in the U.S. produce more Swiss cheese per year, Brewster Dairy is the largest single manufacturer of the "All Natural" variety of American style Swiss Cheese.
