= Professor Kool =

Professor Kool was a character in Professor Kool’s cool skool which aired on WMAR-TV in Baltimore on Saturday mornings from 1967 to 1977 and was hosted by Stu Kerr. It was a television show aimed at children. Each week different children appeared on the show.

Professor Kool was portrayed as a “loony teacher” who wore oversized shoes, an academic’s robe and mortarboard, comically large bow tie, glasses and had a moustache. He aimed to make kids enjoy school more by using songs such as “It’s lots of fun” sung to the tune of "Jingle Bells.”

Another of the weekly features was when children were selected from the audience to play the Pie Face game using the Hasbro toy of the same name. The contestants would line up to stick their faces through the pie hole and yell "SOCK IT TO ME! ... SOCK IT TO ME!" while turning the cranks.

Professor Kool had a nemesis named Miss Spiderweb, a silent, stealthy witch-like wraith who wreaked havoc in the classroom who was played by John Ziemann. Ziemann was a studio technician who was with WMAR for 35 years. As the villain of the show, Miss Spiderweb was frequently the target of the kids on the set and at personal appearances. In fact, he sustained injuries on the set that sent him to the emergency room on three occasions.

One of the shows favorable highlights was Professor Kool’s reading of the lunch menu; a long scroll with wacky unappealing descriptions would have the classmates sounding disgusted. One episode sparked controversy during a "riddle time" segment where a kid used inappropriate context on Professor Kool after asking the question "Why is there a woman on a frying pan?" In a negative response, the kid shouted "EAT ONE CLOWN!" after Professor Kool told the kid that the response "wasn't very nice".
