= The Great Space Coaster =

Children's television series (1981–86)

- Title screen
- Created by: Kermit Love; Jim Martin
- Starring: Emily Bindiger; Chris Gifford; Ray Stephens; Ken Myles; Puppeteers: Pam Arciero; Kevin Clash; Francis Kane; John Lovelady; Noel MacNeal; Jim Martin
- Country of origin: United States
- No. of seasons: 5
- No. of episodes: 250

Production
- Executive producers: Tom Griffin; Joe Bacal; John Claster
- Running time: 30 minutes
- Production companies: Sunbow Productions; Metromedia Television

Original release
- Network: First-run syndication
- Release: January 1981 – September 1986

The Great Space Coaster is an American live-action/animated children's television show that was broadcast in first-run syndication from 1981 to 1986.

== Plot ==
Baxter the clown pilots the space coaster, a roller coaster-like spaceship, to transport the adolescent musicians Francine, Danny, and Roy to the habitable asteroid Coasterville. Populated by strange-looking, wise-cracking puppet characters, the asteroid's denizens include Goriddle Gorilla, Knock Knock the Woodpecker, Edison the Elephant, and Gary Gnu (host of The Gary Gnu Show). Baxter is often evading M.T. Promises, a nefarious ringmaster seeking to re-capture the clown who escaped from his circus. Various celebrity guest stars (such as Mark Hamill of Star Wars fame and composer Marvin Hamlisch) occasionally dropped in, and each episode ends with a different life lesson.

== Format ==
In each episode, Roy shows a short film on his portable, fold-up television. Most often, the segments originated from La Linea, an Italian animated series about a little man who is drawn (using a single line) at the start of the segment and then springs to life, communicating with his animator through high-pitched Italian mixed with gibberish. Other animated shorts including from the National Film Board of Canada, Weston Woods Studios, and Jim Thurman are always segmented within an episode. Francine, Roy, and Danny sing a song together as the Space Coasters in each episode, sometimes originals or covers of 1960s and 1970s hits. The various puppet characters often sing. A few years into the show's run, the MTV-like "Rockin' with Rory" segment began where a VJ named Rory introduced Danny and the Space Coasters performing cover tunes. Other additions include Baffle, Big Jock Ox, and the Huggles. The action was mostly videotaped on the space set, and sometimes the characters venture down to Earth for filmed songs.

== Characters ==
=== Space Coasters ===
- Francine (portrayed by Emily Bindiger) is a young woman from a fishing village on the East Coast and is the leader of the Space Coasters where she plays the guitar. She also acts as Baxter's second-in-command.
- Danny (portrayed by Chris Gifford) is from a small midwestern town, a member of the Space Coasters, and Francine's second-in-command. He plays the drums in the Space Coasters.
- Roy (portrayed by Ray Stephens) is from the big city and a member of the Space Coasters where he plays the keyboards. He is also a good poet. Roy showed clips and short films on his hand-held magic screen.

=== Coasterville inhabitants ===
- Baxter (puppeteered and voiced by Francis Kane) is a large, gentle clown who once worked for M.T. Promises in an apparently slave-like situation at his circus and lives in fear of ever going back. He now pilots the space coaster, taking the characters from Earth to the asteroid. He can magically disappear by twirling around, a talent he uses to escape M.T.'s attempts to catch him and bring him back to his circus.
- Goriddle Gorilla (puppeteered and voiced by Kevin Clash): A gravel-voiced orange gorilla-like creature, he has a tendency to be rude, obnoxious, nosy, lazy, and a nuisance, but somehow the gang on the asteroid seem to like him just the way he is. He is roommates with Edison the Elephant.
- Knock Knock the Woodpecker (puppeteered and voiced by John Lovelady in 1981–1983, Noel MacNeal in 1983–1986) is a prissy pink woodpecker who lives in the hollow of a tree and tells a lot of knock-knock jokes.
- Edison the Elephant (puppeteered and voiced by John Lovelady in 1981–1983, Jim Martin in 1983–1986): A strange, large robotic-looking elephant with a segmented hose-like ever-moving trunk, semi-transparent fan-like ears, and a voice like an echo. He loves plants and tends a large garden. Edison and Goriddle Gorilla are roommates.
- Gary Gnu (puppeteered and voiced by Jim Martin): A green gnu-like newscaster who hosts The Gary Gnu Show, he adds a hard "G" before any words that start with an "N" sound, such as "g-news" for "news" and "g-nothing" for "nothing". This unusual speaking style was inspired by the 1956 Flanders and Swann song "The Gnu".
- Speed Reader (portrayed by Ken Myles): A young man who appears on The Gary Gnu Show to discuss children's books. Described as "the fastest reader in the world", he performs a series of eye exercises before reading a book chosen by Gary within seconds.
- M.T. Promises (puppeteered and voiced by Jim Martin): A nefarious, bulgy-eyed, top hat-wearing, caped ringmaster who is the primary antagonist of the series, he has always been scheming to capture Baxter the Clown and take him back to his circus.
- The Huggles are small, furry creatures who have stories read to them by Baxter (usually about "Bomba the Barbarian"). They consist of Fluffy, Puffy (both puppeteered and voiced by Pam Arciero), and Scruffy (puppeteered and voiced by Kevin Clash). They also have a younger sister named Baby Huggle (puppeteered and voiced by Pam Arciero) who appears later on and who spends most of her time sleeping.
- Rory (puppeteered and voiced by Kevin Clash): A wild-looking lion-like VJ, he appeared a few years into the show's run as the host of "Rockin' with Rory".
- Baffle (puppeteered and voiced by Jim Martin) is a furry, horned magical alien from the neighboring planet Blip (where everything is either backward or upside down or just weird).
- Big Jock Ox (puppeteered and voiced by Kevin Clash): An ox-like character who appeared a few years into the show's run, Big Jock Ox often appeared on The Gary Gnu Show as the sports expert.

== Production ==
The series was co-created by Kermit Love (original Muppet designer and builder for Jim Henson) and Jim Martin (who later went to work on a number of Henson-related projects including Sesame Street). The series' episodes, which were videotaped in New York City, were directed by Dick Feldman and were fitted with a laugh track. It was produced by Sunbow Productions and distributed by Claster Television, a division of Hasbro. The puppets were designed by The Great Jones Studio, New York, under the supervision of Kermit Love. The puppet designers and builders consisted of Jim Kroupa, Robert Lovett, Christoper Lyall, John Orberg, and Matthew Stoddart.

== Soundtrack ==
The soundtrack was released in 1982 by Columbia Records.

Side A 1. (1) The Great Space Coaster Song (written by Anne Bryant and Spencer Michlin)

- (2) The Name Game (written by Lincoln Chase and Shirley Elliston)
- (3) Funnybone

2. Don't Pick Me Last
3. Knock Knock Rock
4. I Like Scary Things
5. Mr. Rhyme
6. (1) Goriddle's Banana Song (I'm Bananas Over Bananas)

- (2) Yellow-Orange Song

Side B 1. Spin About / Jump N' Shout
2. The Thing (written by C. Grean)

- (2) It's Baxter

3. Goriddle Rock
4. Sticks and Stones
5. (1) No Gnews Is Good Gnews

- (2) It's Good to See You Again

6. My Way (Comme D'Habitude) (English lyrics by Paul Anka, French lyrics by Gilles Thibault, music by C. Francois and J. Revaux)

== Reception ==
The title animation won an Emmy Award for Ed Seeman and Ray Favata in 1981.
