= Deep in My Heart (1954 film) =

1954 film by Stanley Donen

- Theatrical release poster
- Directed by: Stanley Donen
- Screenplay by: Leonard Spigelgass
- Based on: Deep in My Heart; 1949 book by Elliott Arnold
- Produced by: Roger Edens
- Starring: José Ferrer; Merle Oberon; Helen Traubel; Walter Pidgeon; Paul Henreid; Rosemary Clooney; Gene Kelly; Fred Kelly; Jane Powell; Vic Damone; Ann Miller; Cyd Charisse; Howard Keel; Tony Martin; Doe Avedon; Tamara Toumanova; Paul Stewart; Isobel Elsom; William Olvis; James Mitchell
- Cinematography: George Folsey
- Edited by: Adrienne Fazan
- Music by: Sigmund Romberg
- Production company: Metro-Goldwyn-Mayer
- Distributed by: Loew's Inc.
- Release date: December 9, 1954
- Running time: 132 minutes
- Country: United States
- Language: English
- Budget: $2,504,000
- Box office: $3,978,000

Deep in My Heart is a 1954 American biographical musical film about the life of operetta composer Sigmund Romberg, who wrote the music for The Student Prince, The Desert Song, and The New Moon, among others. Leonard Spigelgass adapted the film from Elliott Arnold's 1949 biography of the same name. Roger Edens produced, Stanley Donen directed and Eugene Loring choreographed. José Ferrer played Romberg, with support from soprano Helen Traubel as a fictional character and Merle Oberon as actress, playwright, librettist, producer, and director Dorothy Donnelly.

The film, which takes its title from "Deep in My Heart, Dear", a song from The Student Prince, primarily consists of a series of cameo turns by nearly every significant singer or dancer on the MGM lot at the time. These include dancer Cyd Charisse (dubbed by Carol Richards), Rosemary Clooney (Ferrer's wife), Vic Damone, Howard Keel, Gene Kelly and his brother Fred Kelly (their only on-screen appearance together), Tony Martin, Ann Miller, James Mitchell, Jane Powell, Joan Weldon, and the ballerina Tamara Toumanova (dubbed by Betty Wand). Robert Easton, Russ Tamblyn, Susan Luckey, and Ludwig Stössel make uncredited appearances.

Deep in My Heart was the final film in a series of four MGM biopics based on the lives of composers, which included Till the Clouds Roll By (Jerome Kern, 1946), Words and Music (Rodgers and Hart, 1948), and Three Little Words (Kalmar and Ruby, 1950).

== Plot ==
In the 1910s, young Hungarian composer Sigmund Romberg works as a waiter at the Café Vienna on Second Avenue in New York City, which is run by his close friend Anna Mueller. One day, a music agent named Lazar Berrison Sr. comes into the café and, after listening to Anna sing one of Romberg's songs, dismisses Romberg's work as old-fashioned. Undeterred, Romberg writes an upbeat ragtime song titled "Leg of Mutton", which becomes a hit and attracts the attention of Broadway impresario J. J. Shubert. Encouraged by actress Dorothy Donnelly, Shubert buys one of Romberg's songs, "Softly, as in a Morning Sunrise", for the first-act finale of his new Broadway show starring French singer Gaby Deslys.

On opening night, Romberg is disappointed to find that his poignant ballad has been turned into a garish musical number. Later, at the Café Vienna, Shubert's associate, Bert Townsend, offers Romberg a lucrative five-year contract but refuses to grant him artistic control over his work. Romberg rejects the offer before Dorothy convinces him to sign the contract in order to establish a name for himself. Although Romberg writes a series of commercial hits for Shubert, Townsend repeatedly rejects Romberg's script for an operetta titled Maytime. In an effort to attract Shubert's attention, Dorothy introduces Romberg to impresario Florenz Ziegfeld Jr. at an upscale restaurant; Dorothy hands a copy of the operetta to Ziegfeld, who has agreed to play along the ruse, as Shubert and Townsend look on from across the room.

Shubert eventually agrees to produce Maytime, which becomes an immediate hit and propels Romberg to celebrity status. Determined to maintain artistic control, Romberg produces his next show himself, but it is a commercial failure that causes him to lose most of his money. Shubert and Townsend happily agree to take Romberg back and assign him to their latest project, Jazza-Doo. Due to the short deadline, Romberg and writers Ben Judson and Harold Butterfield retreat to a mountain lodge in Saranac Lake to devote themselves exclusively to work on Jazza-Doo.

Riding a bicycle one day, Romberg meets a young woman, Lillian Harris, and her mother, who pay the unkempt Romberg a dollar to fix their flat tire. That evening, Romberg encounters Lillian again at the lodge, and she is surprised to learn that he is the famous composer. Romberg and Lillian soon fall in love with each other and kiss. The next morning, Romberg sends Lillian violets, but she is upset to find that every woman at the lodge has received violets as well. Romberg explains to Lillian that it was Townsend who sent violets to the women as a joke, but she nevertheless parts ways with him.

One year later, Dorothy tells Romberg, who is still heartbroken over Lillian, that she has been adapting a German play into a libretto titled The Student Prince and would like him to write the score. Lillian attends the opening night of Romberg's show Artists and Models with a date, Cumberly, and is spotted by Anna, who invites her to a party at the Café Vienna. To Romberg's surprise, Lillian arrives at the party, and he again professes his love for her, but she insists that a relationship between them would be impossible. After Lillian and Cumberly leave, Romberg excitedly tells Dorothy that he will dedicate himself to The Student Prince.

After the opening night of The Student Prince, Lillian approaches Romberg in the empty theater and declares her love. Romberg and Lillian are married, and his career continues to thrive. Years later, Dorothy is too ill to attend the opening night of her latest collaboration with Romberg, My Maryland, and dies a few weeks later. Although saddened by Dorothy's death, Romberg works on a new show with Oscar Hammerstein II, the hugely successful New Moon. Romberg's next few shows fail to make an impact, and encouraged by Lillian, he conducts his own music at Carnegie Hall, accompanied by a full symphony orchestra and featuring a performance by Anna. The concert is a success, and Romberg concludes with a tribute to Lillian.

== Cast ==
- José Ferrer as Sigmund Romberg
- Merle Oberon as Dorothy Donnelly
- Helen Traubel as Anna Mueller
- Doe Avedon as Lillian Harris Romberg
- Walter Pidgeon as J. J. Shubert
- Paul Henreid as Florenz Ziegfeld Jr.
- Tamara Toumanova as Gaby Deslys
  - Betty Wand as Gaby Deslys (singing voice)
- Paul Stewart as Bert Townsend
- Isobel Elsom as Mrs. Harris
- David Burns as Lazar Berrison Sr.
- Jim Backus as Ben Judson

== Musical numbers ==
- "Overture" – Orchestral and choral medley:
- "One Kiss" (from 1928 operetta The New Moon, lyrics by Oscar Hammerstein II)
- "Desert Song" (from 1926 operetta The Desert Song, lyrics by Oscar Hammerstein II and Otto A. Harbach)
- "Deep in My Heart, Dear" (from 1924 operetta The Student Prince, lyrics by Dorothy Donnelly)
- "You Will Remember Vienna" (from 1930 film Viennese Nights, lyrics by Oscar Hammerstein II)
- "You Will Remember Vienna" – Helen Traubel (from 1930 film Viennese Nights, lyrics by Oscar Hammerstein II)
- "Leg of Mutton" – José Ferrer and Helen Traubel (turkey trot with lyrics added by Roger Edens)
- "Softly, as in a Morning Sunrise" – Betty Wand (dubbing for Tamara Toumanova) (from 1928 operetta The New Moon, lyrics by Oscar Hammerstein II)
- "Softly, as in a Morning Sunrise" – Helen Traubel (from 1928 operetta The New Moon, lyrics by Oscar Hammerstein II)
- "Mr. & Mrs." – Rosemary Clooney and José Ferrer (from 1922 musical The Blushing Bride, lyrics by Cyrus D. Wood)
- "I Love to Go Swimmin' with Wimmen" – Gene Kelly and his brother, Fred Kelly (from 1921 musical Love Birds, lyrics by Ballard MacDonald)
- "Road to Paradise"/"Will You Remember (Sweetheart)" – Vic Damone and Jane Powell (from 1917 musical Maytime, lyrics by Rida Johnson Young)
- "Girls Goodbye" – José Ferrer (lyrics by Dorothy Donnelly)
- "Fat Fat Fatima" – José Ferrer (from 1921 musical Love Birds, lyrics by Ballard MacDonald)
- "Jazza-Dada-Doo" – José Ferrer (from 1921 musical Bombo, lyrics by Harold Atteridge)
- "It" – Ann Miller (from 1926 operetta The Desert Song, lyrics by Oscar Hammerstein II and Otto A. Harbach)
- "Serenade" – William Olvis (from 1924 operetta The Student Prince, lyrics by Dorothy Donnelly)
- "One Alone" – Carol Richards (dubbing for Cyd Charisse) and James Mitchell (from 1926 operetta The Desert Song, lyrics by Oscar Hammerstein II and Otta A. Harbach)
- "Your Land and My Land" – Howard Keel (from 1927 musical My Maryland, lyrics by Dorothy Donnelly)
- "Auf Wiedersehn" – Helen Traubel (from 1915 musical The Blue Paradise, lyrics by Herbert Reynolds)
- "Lover, Come Back to Me" – Tony Martin with Joan Weldon (from 1928 operetta The New Moon, lyrics by Oscar Hammerstein II)
- "Stout-Hearted Men" – Helen Traubel (from 1928 operetta The New Moon, lyrics by Oscar Hammerstein II)
- "When I Grow Too Old to Dream" – José Ferrer (from 1935 film The Night Is Young, lyrics by Oscar Hammerstein II)

== Reception ==
=== Box office ===
According to MGM records, Deep in My Heart earned $2,471,000 in the US and Canada and $1,507,000 elsewhere, resulting in a profit of $1,474,000.

=== Critical reaction ===
Bosley Crowther of The New York Times wrote: "As one would expect in such an item, this medley of melodies, which is designed to pretend to tell a story of Mr. Romberg's successful career, runs more to showy presentation of the more familiar of the composer's tunes than it does to a logical development of dramatic values in the life of the man."

William Brogdon of Variety praised Ferrer's performance, writing he "has an assignment with enough demands of versatility to satisfy any actor. He sings, he dances, he clowns, he romances as he brings the Romberg character to the screen in Ferrer style."

Philip K. Scheuer of the Los Angeles Times felt Ferrer made "the part more eventful than the outline of the man's career simply by demonstrating that there is little he cannot do drama, dialect comedy, singing, dancing, conducting. In these versatile endeavors he is scarcely likely; to please everyone, but he can hardly fail to astonish anyone."

Harrison's Reports felt "the story follows a more or less familiar backstage pattern, but it is warm, humorous and romantic, and has effective touches of human interest. Jose Ferrer is very good as Romberg, and the part gives him ample opportunity to display his versatile talents, not only as a dramatic actor, but also as a comedian and as a song-and-dance man."

John McCarten of The New Yorker felt the interpersonal conflicts within the story were "rather thin strands on which to construct a plot—even the plot of a venture that is inevitably going to boil down to a good deal of singing and dancing and Gemütlichkeit."
