= Fairless High School =

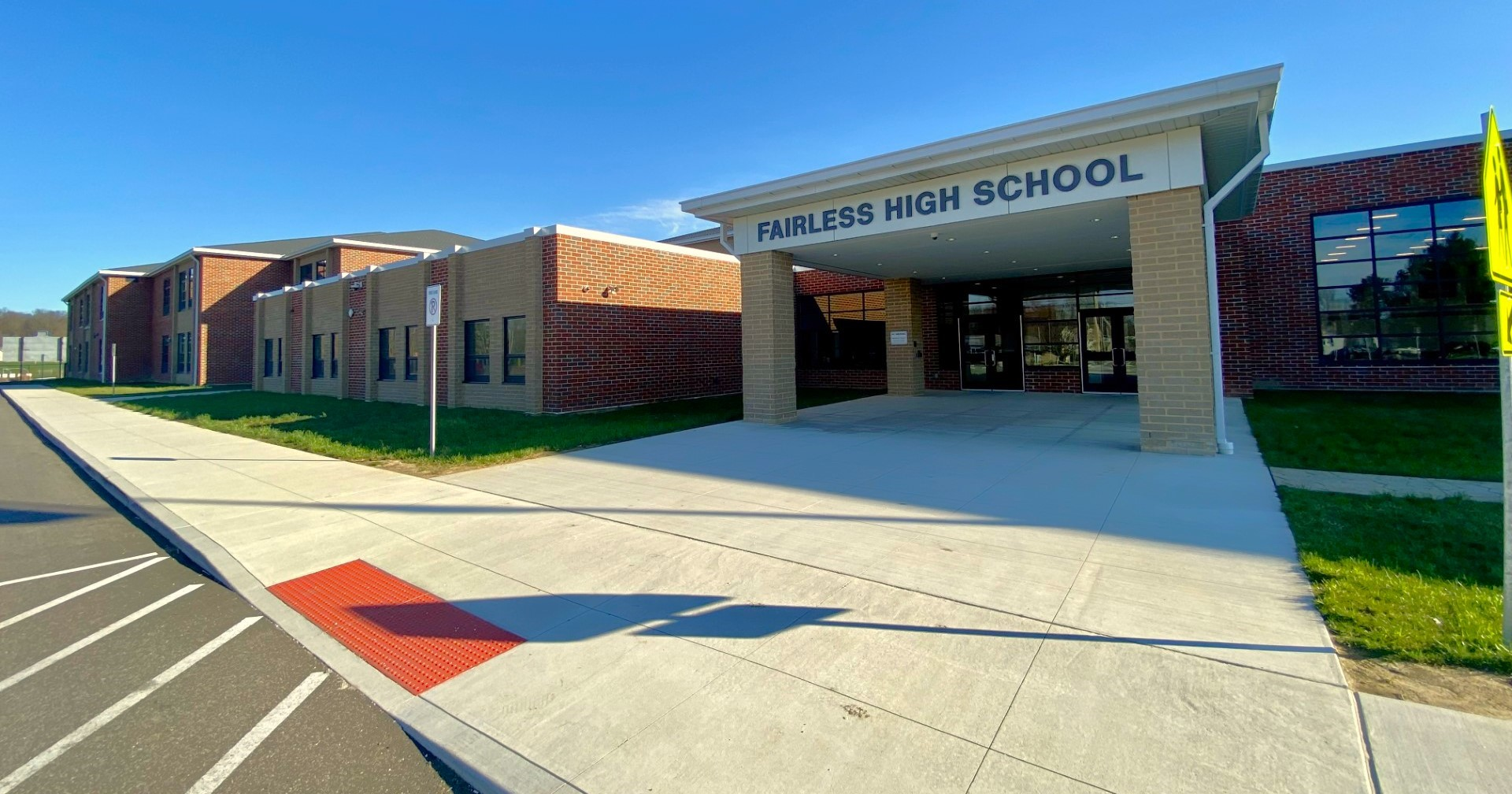

Location
- 800 7th St SE; Brewster, Ohio 44613; United States
- Coordinates: 40°42′13.5″N 81°35′6.6″W

Information
- Type: Public high school
- School district: Fairless Local School District
- Principal: Chad Merritt
- Grades: 9–12
- Enrollment: 335 (2023-2024)
- Language: English
- Colors: Navy blue, silver, and white
- Athletics: OHSAA Class AA
- Athletics conference: Pac 7
- Team name: Falcons
- Communities served: Brewster; Navarre; Beach City; Wilmot
- Website: fhs.fairlesslocalschools.org

Fairless High School is a public high school in Brewster, Ohio, United States. It is the only high school in the Fairless Local School District. The high school combines students from the villages of Brewster, Beach City, Navarre, Wilmot and some surrounding townships. It serves grades 9 through 12 and its colors are navy blue, silver and white. The mascot is "Freddie" the falcon.

== History ==
There were elementary schools in Brewster, Beach City, and Navarre and after the closing of the Justus middle school, the middle school students were housed in the basement of the high school, until a new middle school and a new elementary school were opened to students and faculty in the fall of 2007. After the new schools were finished, the contents of the old elementaries were auctioned off and the schools were demolished. The high school was built in 1965 on land donated by Mr. Benjamin Fairless. The high school was built to keep up with the growing communities. Before the time of the creation of the Fairless Local School district there were three main high schools, the Navarre Rams, the Beach City Pirates, and the Brewster Railroaders.

== Distinguished Fairless Falcon Award ==
The Distinguished Fairless Falcon Award was established in late 2008. The school district wanted to recognize outstanding alumni, former faculty, staff, non-graduates, and community members of Brewster, Beach City, Navarre and Fairless Schools who have maintained a high standard of excellence and made a significant contribution in their field after graduation.

=== Hall of Honor ===
Those who are given the Distinguished Fairless Falcon Award become members of the Hall of Honor, which is located in the front hallway of the high school. Induction into the Hall of Honor will take place at the annual Fall Football Homecoming celebration. A maximum of five inductees will be selected per year.
