= Jim Martin (puppeteer) =

American puppeteer

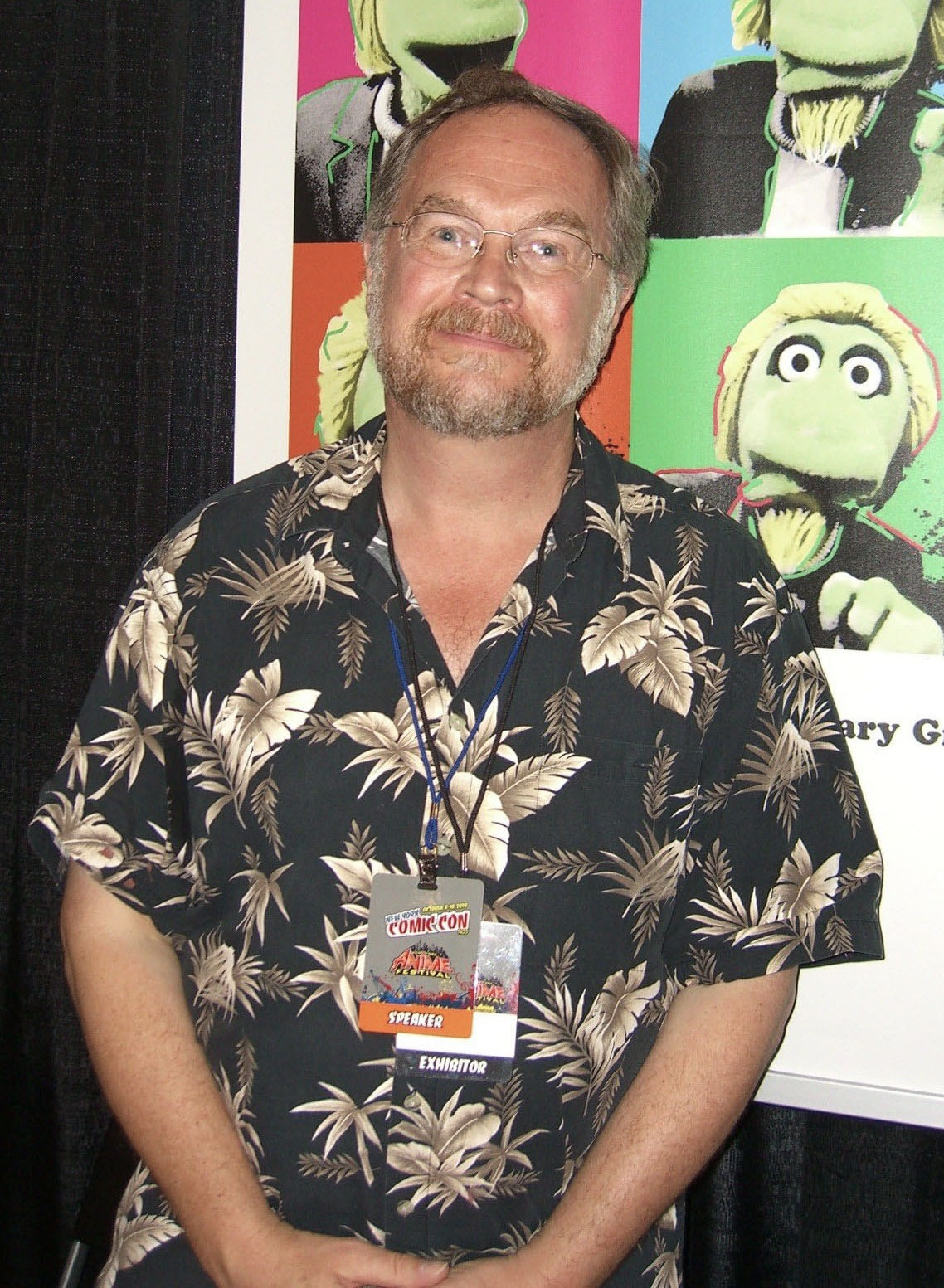
- Martin at New York Comic Con in 2010.
- Occupations: Puppeteer; director
- Years active: 1977–present
- Website: jimmartinproductions.com

Jim Martin is an American puppeteer and director, best known for his roles on Sesame Street. As part of the cast, he has won an Emmy Award. He has been nominated multiple times, and won for "Outstanding Achievement in Costume Design/Styling" at the Emmys, also for Sesame Street.

== Career ==
In the 1970s, Martin puppeteered a character in another local show, Adventure Time.

Martin performed as one of the main puppet characters on the live-action/animated kids TV series The Great Space Coaster (1981–1986) as Gary Gnu - "This is Gary Gnu, your no-gnews gnews reporter" and as the villain M.T. Promises.

Martin was a producer and director on the show Johnny and the Sprites, and is the creator and owner of the Anybody Pupplets.

At the Visitors Center of Herr's Corporation in Nottingham, Pennsylvania, Martin's work as Chipper was featured in the film used to preview visitors for the snack factory tour.

His present venture is called Costume Armour, Inc.

== Filmography ==
- Sesame Street - Preston Rabbit, Harry the Hopping Haystack, Betty Lou's Dad, Additional Muppets
- The Puzzle Place - Ben Olafson, Green Piece Police
- The Book of Pooh - Eeyore (assistant)
- Elmo's World - Cactus, Computer
- Eureeka's Castle
- Johnny and the Sprites
- Once Upon a Tree - Forrest the Beaver
- The Great Space Coaster
- Dragon Tales - Additional Voices
- Between The Lions
- Jim Henson Play Along Video - Additional Muppets
- Bear in the Big Blue House
- The Planet Matzah Ball

Martin was a Guest of Honor at Anthrocon 2010, the world's largest furry convention, and also at Eurofurence 17, Europe's largest furry convention, in 2011.
