= Kevin Clash =

American puppeteer (born 1960)

- Clash at GalaxyCon Des Moines in 2026
- Born: Kevin Jeffrey Clash; September 17, 1960 (age 66); Baltimore, Maryland, U.S.
- Education: Dundalk High School
- Occupations: Puppeteer; director; producer
- Years active: 1978–2012; 2018–present
- Spouse: Genia Clash (m. 1986; div. 2003)
- Children: 1

Kevin Jeffrey Clash (born September 17, 1960) is an American puppeteer, director and producer best known for puppeteering Elmo on Sesame Street from 1985 to 2012. He also performed puppets for Labyrinth, Dinosaurs, Oobi, and various Muppet productions.

Clash developed an interest in puppetry at an early age and, in his teen years, performed for local television children's shows in his hometown of Baltimore, Maryland. He joined the cast of Captain Kangaroo in the early 1980s and began performing on Sesame Street in 1984. He was the fifth puppeteer to perform Elmo, who became his signature character, and he also served as an executive producer and director for the show. Clash worked in various productions with The Jim Henson Company and occasionally on other projects. Clash's autobiography, My Life as a Furry Red Monster, was published in 2006; he was later the subject of the documentary Being Elmo: A Puppeteer's Journey (2011).

Clash resigned from Sesame Street in 2012 after allegations of sexual impropriety with minors, all of which he denied and were later dismissed due to expiration of the statute of limitations. Clash returned to puppeteering as a supporting performer in the adult comedy The Happytime Murders (2018).

== Early years ==
Clash was born in Baltimore, Maryland, on September 17, 1960, the third of four children born to George Clash, a flash welder and handyman, and Gladys Clash, who ran a small daycare center in their two-bedroom, one-bath home in the Turner Station area of Dundalk, Maryland. Clash developed an interest in puppetry at an early age, inspired by children's shows like Kukla, Fran and Ollie and Sesame Street. He made his first puppet, a version of Mickey Mouse, at the age of 10. When he was twelve, he made a monkey puppet out of the lining of his father's coat. His first performances were for his mother's daycare children.

By the time he was a teenager, he had built almost 90 puppets, which he based upon commercials, popular music, and his friends. While still in high school, Clash performed at venues throughout Baltimore, including schools, churches, fundraisers, and community events. While appearing at a neighborhood festival, Clash was discovered by Baltimore television personality Stu Kerr, who became Clash's first mentor and hired him to perform in the children's show Caboose at Channel 2. Clash also built puppets for the Romper Room franchise. When he was 17, he contacted and met puppeteer Kermit Love, who became Clash's mentor, after seeing Love featured in an episode of the children's educational television series Call It Macaroni. In 1979, on Love's recommendation, Clash appeared as Cookie Monster in the Sesame Street float during the Macy's Thanksgiving Day Parade and met Jim Henson, who later became his boss, mentor, and good friend.

When he was 19, Clash became a puppeteer for Captain Kangaroo, initially as a guest performer, in which he also made occasional on-camera appearances. The producers of Captain Kangaroo used some of Clash's puppet creations for the show. In 1984, Clash had to turn down Henson's offer to work on his film The Dark Crystal because he was working on two TV shows at the same time, Captain Kangaroo and Love's syndicated program The Great Space Coaster, in which he was producer for the first time.

== Career ==
Captain Kangaroo was canceled in 1984 after 29 seasons, and Great Space Coaster ended, freeing up Clash to work on projects with Henson such as the film Labyrinth and Sesame Street. Clash started working at Sesame Street for ten episodes in 1983, mostly performing nondescript, stand-in puppets known as Anything Muppets. Some of his earliest characters included the saxophone-playing Hoots the Owl (based on Louis Armstrong), the infant Baby Natasha, and inventor Dr. Nobel Price. He worked on the 1985 feature film Follow That Bird. After 1985, Elmo, a furry red monster, became his main character. Three puppeteers, including Richard Hunt, had performed Elmo previously, but it was Clash's development, with a falsetto voice, that established the character. He based Elmo's character on the preschool children that attended his mother's daycare in Baltimore and upon his own personality and the personality of his parents. Clash followed the advice of fellow puppeteer Frank Oz, who told Clash to always "find one special hook" for each character. Clash decided that the central characteristic for Elmo should be that he "should represent love".

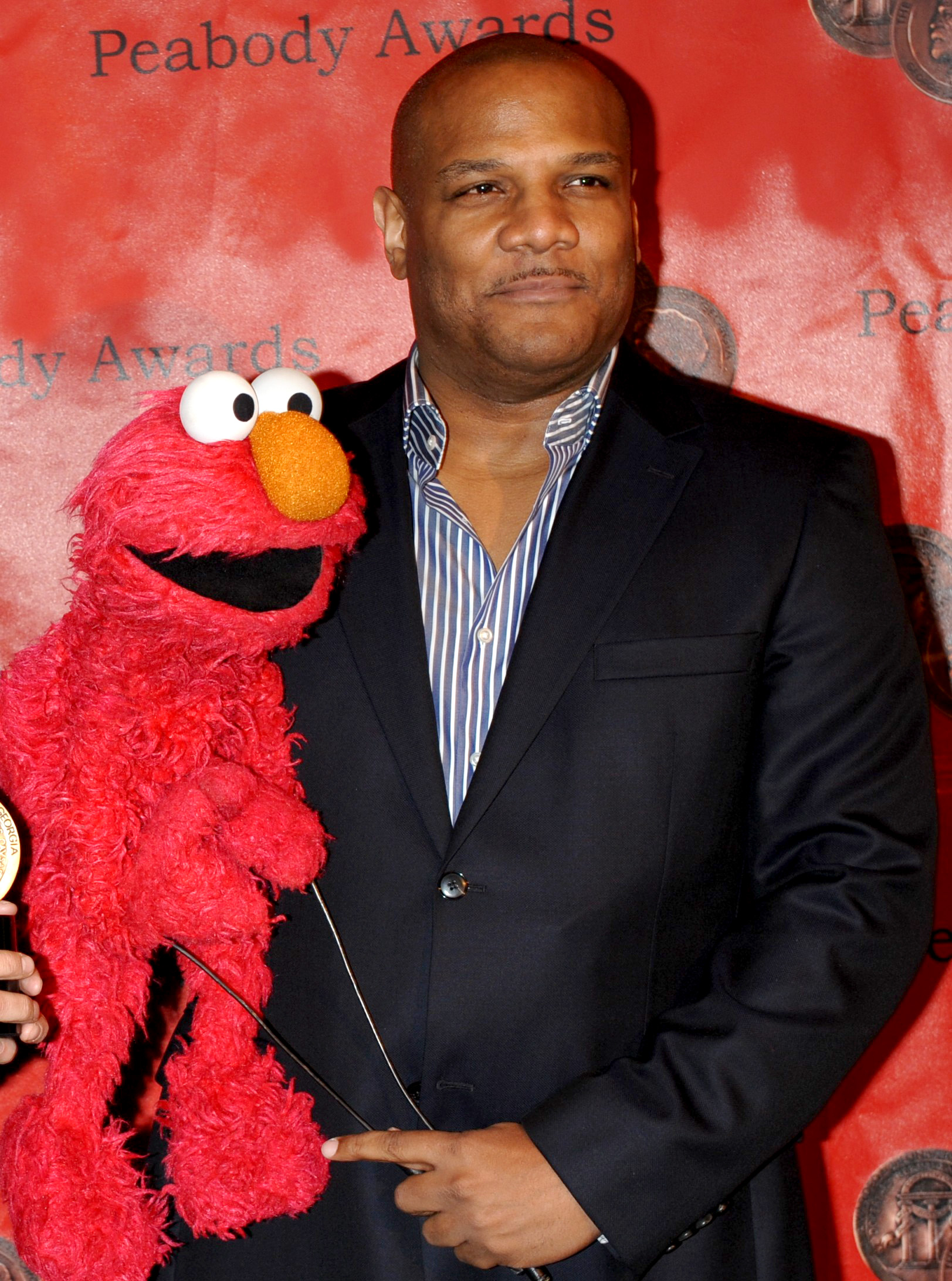
Clash with Elmo at the Peabody Awards in 2010

After the height of Elmo's popularity, especially the "Tickle Me Elmo" craze in 1996, Clash's responsibilities at Sesame Street increased. He recruited, auditioned, and trained its puppeteers, and became the senior Muppet coordinator, a writer, director, and co-producer of the "Elmo's World" segment of the show. Clash worked with and mentored the puppeteers of Sesame Street's international co-productions. He found working with the co-productions "a lot of fun" and "very rewarding". In 2007, he was promoted to senior creative adviser for the Sesame Workshop. Until 2011, he was the sole performer as Elmo in all his public relations appearances, making his schedule, as he called it, "crazy". Cheryl Henson, president of the Jim Henson Foundation, called him "essential" to the show.

Clash worked on the first film version of Teenage Mutant Ninja Turtles in 1990 and the sequel, Teenage Mutant Ninja Turtles II: The Secret of the Ooze, which was dedicated to Henson, in 1991, voicing Master Splinter. He performed in several productions with Jim Henson Productions, including as the Muppet Clifford in The Jim Henson Hour (1989), (Note: Clash appeared as Clifford on The Arsenio Hall Show with Jim Henson, which was Henson's last televised appearance before his death in 1990.) and performing the puppetry for Frank Oz's characters (Miss Piggy, Fozzie Bear, Sam the Eagle, and Animal) in Muppet Treasure Island (1996). Clash performed in the films Muppets from Space (1999) and The Muppets' Wizard of Oz (2005), and the TV series Muppets Tonight (1996–1998), in which he reprised Clifford, who served as the show's host. He performed characters and worked behind the scenes on the sitcom Dinosaurs.

In 2006, Clash published his autobiography, co-written by Gary Brozek and Louis Henry Mitchell, entitled My Life as a Furry Red Monster: What Being Elmo Has Taught Me About Life, Love and Laughing Out Loud. His life was featured in the 2011 documentary Being Elmo: A Puppeteer's Journey.

After a hiatus of several years, Clash returned to performing with the film The Happytime Murders (2018), directed by Brian Henson and co-produced through Henson Alternative. He later puppeteered in the 2019 Netflix series The Dark Crystal: Age of Resistance, which serves as a prequel series to the 1982 Jim Henson film The Dark Crystal.

== Personal life ==
Clash has stated that although children ignore him and speak directly to Elmo, Black adults tend to be surprised when they meet him. He has stated in interviews that his racial identity was pertinent to his work, and that it came through in his performances.

Clash was married for 17 years and has a daughter who was born in 1993.

In November 2012, Clash publicly revealed his homosexuality in response to the allegations that led to his resignation from Sesame Workshop, stating, "I am a gay man. I have never been ashamed of this or tried to hide it, but felt it was a personal and private matter."

In 2015, Clash moved to Los Angeles to work on other Jim Henson Company productions, including The Happytime Murders and The Dark Crystal: Age of Resistance, performing Lyle and Mr. Bumblypants in the former and Aughra in the latter.

=== Abuse allegations ===
In November 2012, 23-year-old Sheldon Stephens alleged that he had been in a sexual relationship with Clash that began when Stephens was 16, which would be a felony under New York law that declares any sexual relationship with individuals under 17 years of age illegal. Sesame Workshop had initially been presented with the allegation in June, and its investigation found the allegation to be unsubstantiated. Clash acknowledged that he had been in a relationship with the accuser; however, he said the relationship was between two consenting adults. Stephens later recanted his accusation, but two weeks later, another accuser, Cecil Singleton, accused Clash of sexually abusing him when he was 15 years old, and lawsuits were filed by attorney Jeffrey Herman against Clash.

Clash resigned from Sesame Workshop on November 20, 2012, and released a statement saying, "Personal matters have diverted attention away from the important work 'Sesame Street' is doing and I cannot allow it to go on any longer. I am deeply sorry to be leaving and am looking forward to resolving these personal matters privately". Sesame Workshop also released a statement: "Unfortunately, the controversy surrounding Kevin's personal life has become a distraction that none of us want, and he has concluded that he can no longer be effective in his job and has resigned from 'Sesame Street'." They stated that other puppeteers had been trained to serve as Clash's understudy and would take over his roles on the show.

In July 2013, the three cases against Clash were dismissed because it was ruled that the claims were made more than six years after the alleged violations took place, or beyond the time limit following their 18th birthdays. Clash's lawyers expressed his hope that the ruling would allow him to restore his personal and professional life. Lawyers for the plaintiffs appealed the ruling, alleging that the psychological effects of the abuse were not fully realized until 2012. In April 2014, the decision to dismiss the three lawsuits was upheld by the U.S. Court of Appeals. Months after the other alleged victims made legal accusations, Stephens filed a lawsuit in Pennsylvania against Clash, but it was ultimately dismissed in June 2014 because the statute of limitations had passed.

In Family Guy's sixteenth season, in the episode, "The Woof of Wall Street", a joke was made about Clash's alleged abuse by questioning Elmo.

== Filmography ==
Year	Title	Role(s)
1980–1984	Captain Kangaroo	Artie, himself
1980–1984	The Great Space Coaster	Goriddle Gorilla, Rory, Big Jock Ox, Scruffy
1983–2012	Sesame Street	Elmo, Baby Fats Domino, Benny Rabbit, Billy Idle, Chip Cat, Clementine, Hoots the Owl, Kingston Livingston III, Mario, Paul Pencil, Chef John, Warren Wolf, Watson, Wolfgang the Seal, Natasha, Mel, Counting Crows Lead Singer, Additional Muppets
1985	Sesame Street Presents: Follow That Bird	Additional Muppets (voice)
1985–1993	Muppet Meeting Films	Luncheon Counter Monster, Franklin, Bob, additional Muppets
1986	The Tale of the Bunny Picnic	Be-Bop Bunny, Father Bunny, additional Muppets
1986	Labyrinth	Firey
1987	Inner Tube	Drummer
1988	Jim Henson's Play-Along Video	P.J., Artie, Be-Bop Bunny, Luncheon Counter Monster, additional Muppets
1989	The Song of the Cloud Forest	Nick, Caiman
1989	The Jim Henson Hour	Leon, Clifford, Bob, Blue-Green Extreme, Codzilla, Himself, additional Muppets
1990	The Cosby Show	Cliff's Nightmare
1990	Teenage Mutant Ninja Turtles	Splinter
1990	The Muppets at Walt Disney World	Clifford, Alligator, Frog, Ace Yu
1990	The Muppets Celebrate Jim Henson	Clifford, Elmo, additional Muppets
1990	Basil Hears a Noise	Elmo, Chip Cat, Watson the Dog and Warren Wolf
1991	Teenage Mutant Ninja Turtles II: The Secret of the Ooze	Splinter
1991–1994	Dinosaurs	Baby Sinclair, Howard Handupme, Howlin' Jay, additional characters
1992–1995	Dog City	Ace Yu (special), Eliot Shag (series), additional Muppets
1993–1996	Muppet Sing-Alongs	Billy Bunny, Clifford, Bad Polly, Black Dog, Spa'am, additional Muppets
1994	Muppet Time	Do Re Mi Monster, Jeffy, Huffy Monster
1994	The Best of Elmo	Elmo, Wolfgang the Seal
1995	Mr. Willowby's Christmas Tree	Father Mouse, Owl
1996–2002	The Rosie O'Donnell Show	Elmo
1996–2002	Tots TV	Tiny (US version only)
1996	Muppet Treasure Island	Fozzie Bear (puppetry only), Miss Piggy (puppetry only), Sam Eagle (puppetry only), Animal (puppetry only), Bad Polly, Black Dog, Spa'am, additional Muppets
1996	Muppets Tonight	Clifford, Mulch, Bad Polly, Carter, Craniac, Bart, Waldorf, Animal, additional Muppets
1996	Elmocize	Elmo, Benny Rabbit
1997	123 Count with Me	Benny Rabbit
1997	Elmo Says Boo!	Elmo, Kingston Livingston III
1998	The Wubbulous World of Dr. Seuss	Little Cat Fleep
1998–2009	Elmo's World	Elmo, Baby Natasha, Benny Rabbit, Wolfgang the Seal
1999	Muppets from Space	Clifford, Carter, additional Muppets
1999	The Adventures of Elmo in Grouchland	Elmo, Pestie, Grouch Cab Driver, Grouch Jailer
2002	It's a Very Merry Muppet Christmas Movie	Sam the Eagle
2002	Bert & Ernie's Word Play	Elmo, Benny Rabbit
2003–2005	Oobi	Randy, additional characters
2003	Sesame Street 4-D Movie Magic	Elmo
2004	The West Wing	Elmo (Season 5, Episode 16 "Eppur Si Muove")
2004–2005	The Tony Danza Show	Elmo
2005	The Muppets' Wizard of Oz	Clifford, Black Dog, additional Muppets
2007	Elmo's Christmas Countdown	Elmo, Hoots, Billy Bunny, Mel, Mouse King, Wolfgang the Seal
2007–2012	Bert and Ernie's Great Adventures	Elmo
2008	Abby in Wonderland	Elmo/Red Rabbit
2008	A Muppet's Christmas: Letters to Santa	Additional Muppets
2009	Scrubs	Elmo
2009	The Game	Himself/Mookie (puppet)
2012–2013	Elmo the Musical	Elmo
2018	The Happytime Murders	Lyle, Mr. Bumblypants
2019	The Dark Crystal: Age of Resistance	Aughra, Skeksis skekVar/The General, skekMal/The Hunter, The Gelfling Librarian, Gruenak #1, additional voices
2020	Earth to Ned	Additional puppeteer
2022	Fraggle Rock: Back to the Rock	Uncle Travelling Matt (puppeteer)

== Awards and honors ==
- Clash won Daytime Emmy Awards for Outstanding Performer in a Children's Series for his work as Elmo on Sesame Street in 1990, 2005–2007, and 2009–2013. In all, he has won 27 daytime Emmys and one prime-time Emmy.
- He was the first recipient of the 'Miss Jean' Worthley Award for Service to Families and Children given by Maryland Public Television on June 9, 2007.
- On May 19, 2012, Clash was presented with an honorary degree from Washington & Jefferson College.

Preceded by Richard Hunt	Elmo performer 1985–2013	Succeeded by Ryan Dillon
Preceded by Jerry Nelson	Performer of Mulch; 1990s	Succeeded by None
Preceded by Brian Meehl	Performer of Clementine; 1985–1988	Succeeded by Camille Bonora
Preceded by Brian Meehl	Performer of Dr. Nobel Price; 1984–1988	Succeeded by None
Preceded by None	Performer of Clifford; 1989–2005	Succeeded by None
Preceded by None	Performer of Hoots the Owl; 1985–2012	Succeeded by Christopher Hayes
Preceded by Frank Oz	Performer of Sam the Eagle; 2002–2003	Succeeded by Eric Jacobson

== Works cited ==
- Clash, Kevin, Gary Brozek, and Louis Henry Mitchell (2006). My Life as a Furry Red Monster: What Being Elmo has Taught Me About Life, Love and Laughing Out Loud. New York: Random House. ISBN 0-7679-2375-8
- Davis, Michael (2008). Street Gang: The Complete History of Sesame Street. New York: Viking Penguin. ISBN 978-0-670-01996-0
- Herman, Karen (2004-07-20). Archive of American Television. Parts 1–4.
- Marks, Constance (Director) (2011) (DVD). Being Elmo: A Puppeteer's Journey.
