= Jeff Herman =

American trial lawyer (born 1959)

- Born: Jeffrey Herman; 1959 (age 66–67); Youngstown, Ohio, U.S.
- Education: University of Arizona (BS); Case Western Reserve University School of Law (JD)
- Occupation: Attorney
- Known for: Litigating sexual abuse complaints
- Website: Official website

Jeffrey Marc "Jeff" Herman (born 1959) is an American trial lawyer specializing in representing victims of sexual abuse. He is the founding and managing partner of the South Florida-based law-firm, Herman Law, and has been described in the media as "the nation's leading attorney when it comes to handling high-profile sexual abuse lawsuits".

Herman's work has garnered substantial publicity for bringing cases against alleged sexual predators and institutions that protect them. He has been featured in The New York Times, USA Today, Forbes, People, and New York magazine and is a contributor to The O'Reilly Factor, MSNBC, and CNN. Amongst his cases, he is known for exposing the clergy sexual abuse scandal in the Archdiocese of Miami and the Archdiocese of Denver. Herman is also noted for securing a landmark $100 million verdict on behalf of a client who was sexually abused by Rev. Neil Doherty, one of the largest verdicts ever against an individual priest. He has also represented clients against public figures, including financier Jeffrey Epstein, puppeteer Kevin Clash, and director Bryan Singer. In 2015, Herman stated that he had litigated more than 800 cases in the field.

== Early life, education, and career ==
Jeff Herman was born and raised in Youngstown, Ohio. He attended the University of Arizona in Tucson, Arizona and received a J.D. from Case Western Reserve University School of Law in Cleveland, Ohio in 1985, where he also served on the editorial board of the Canada-United States Law Journal.

He began practicing law in Florida in 1985, and "was a successful commercial lawyer before he shifted exclusively to sexual-abuse". In one case during this period, in 1995, Herman successfully represented Robin Elkins, a saxophonist who had patented a means of storing and retrieving bits of sound on a computer, a technology that led to electronic voice mail.

Jeff Herman is the Founder of Herman Law, where he serves as Managing Partner. The firm has exclusively represented victims of sexual abuse nationwide for more than 25 years.

== Sexual Abuse Cases ==
=== Cases involving religious and educational settings ===
Herman's specialization in sexual abuse cases began with a 1997 case against Nova Southeastern University, which had failed to conduct a background check on a convicted child sex offender who had volunteered for a program run by the school, and who had molested an autistic child. Herman credited this case a shift in his career and a search for meaning that has been fulfilled by seeking justice for victims of abuse.

Herman began to gain national attention in his field when he represented victims of clergy sexual abuse in over 100 cases against the Archdiocese of Miami. In 2003, he represented the victim in the first sexual abuse lawsuit against the Archdiocese of Miami allowed to go to trial. For years, the Catholic Church was able to have sexual abuse cases dismissed on statute of limitations technicalities. Herman became one of the first attorneys to successfully defeat this strategy, arguing that the archdiocese had committed fraud by keeping a priest's sexual abuse history secret. In 2004, Herman represented the victims of Rev. Alvaro Guichard, a Catholic priest accused of sexually abusing four children in the 1970s. Guichard unexpectedly crashed a news conference held by Herman and the family of one of Guichard's deceased victims following the filing of the lawsuit. At this event, the priest then confronted the family, calling them liars while grabbing the brother of the victim's arm. Herman was able to pull Guichard off of the brother just before police arrived on the scene. Following the incident, Guichard filed a suit against Herman, claiming he defamed him when he accused him of rape and sodomy, but the case was subsequently dismissed by the Miami-Dade Circuit Court in 2012.

In the early 2000s, Herman tried his first cases regarding abuse of Native Americans under the authority of a Catholic diocese. It was reported at the time that "Herman is known nationally as a plaintiff's lawyer in clergy sexual abuse cases, but his reputation in Indian law circles is less established". In 2006, Herman represented an alleged victim of Anthony Mercieca, the priest accused of molesting U.S. congressman Mark Foley. The lawsuit alleged that Mercieca fondled and performed oral sex on the victim, who was a 13-year-old altar boy at St. James Church in North Miami, Florida. The suit sought $10 million in damages and settled in 2007 for an undisclosed amount. That same year, Herman represented victims of Rabbi Joel Kolko, who was accused of molesting multiple young students of his yeshiva. The case was the first lawsuit against a Jewish leader to be filed following the Catholic Church sex abuse scandal. In 2007, Herman represented the alleged victim of Don Walk, a former team chaplain of the Miami Dolphins NFL team. Walk allegedly took the boy to local Miami Dolphins games, introduced him to team players, and brought him to the house of coach Don Shula while grooming the boy for abuse.

In 2011, Herman won a $100 million verdict for a victim of Father Neil Doherty, a priest of the Archdiocese of Miami accused of drugging and raping church youths. The result was the nation's largest jury verdict for a sexual abuse case in 2011 and among the 20 highest awarded verdicts overall in the year. The following year, Herman – along with attorneys Adam Horowitz and Arick Fudali – won a $3 million jury verdict on behalf of a young girl who was sexually abused at Discovery Day Care. Testimony showed that the preschooler had been abused on multiple occasions by the daycare director's 13-year-old son and that a center employee had falsified documents related to the incident.

In 2014, Herman won a $5.25 million verdict for a boy in a sexual abuse lawsuit against Charter Schools USA. The verdict is believed to be among the highest ever in a charter school sexual abuse case.

In 2019, Herman represented New York clergy sex abuse victims in a lawsuit against the Vatican and Pope Francis, contending negligence in addressing misconduct within the priesthood.

In 2024, Herman’s firm took up legal representation for former foster children alleging to have experienced sexual abuse at the A.B. and Jessie Polinsky Children's Center between 1994 and 2020, filing 75 lawsuits against San Diego County.

In October 2024, Herman represented a former student in their civil case against the Bay Shore Union Free School District in Suffolk County, New York. The jury awarded $25 million in damages after finding the district liable for negligence in supervision and for acting with reckless disregard in retaining an elementary school teacher, despite multiple prior allegations of sexual abuse. The award was reported as one of the largest granted under New York’s Child Victims Act.

Also in October 2024, Herman and attorneys at Herman Law secured a court order compelling the Roman Catholic Diocese of Brooklyn to release un-redacted personnel files of former priest Romano Ferraro. The ruling, issued by Judge Sabrina B. Kraus in the Supreme Court of New York, Kings County, was a significant development in ongoing litigation concerning allegations of sexual abuse by Ferraro. The court emphasized that failure to comply with the order could result in sanctions against the Diocese, including the potential striking of its legal defenses.

In May 2025, Herman and attorneys at Herman Law joined a small group of other firms in securing one of the largest sexual abuse settlements in U.S. History, with the Los Angeles County Board of Supervisors unanimously approving a $4 billion settlement to more than 7,000 plaintiffs who brought claims that they were abused while in juvenile detention or foster care from the 1980s to the 2000s.

=== Cases involving celebrities & powerful figures ===
Over the course of his career, Herman and his firm have also represented victims and individuals alleging abuse from celebrities and powerful public figures.

In 2008, Herman represented several teenage victims of financier Jeffrey Epstein. Epstein was convicted of felony solicitation of prostitution and procurement of a person under the age of 18 for prostitution. Herman filed a civil suit representing victims alleged to have been 14-years-old when they were brought to Epstein's mansion to perform erotic massages. The suit sought $50 million in damages and eventually settled for an undisclosed amount.

Throughout 2012 and 2013, Herman represented five alleged victims of Elmo puppeteer, Kevin Clash. On November 20, 2012, Herman filed a lawsuit detailing allegations that Clash sexually abused a 15-year-old boy he met on a gay phone chatline. Clash publicly resigned from Sesame Street later that day. While discussing the sexual abuse lawsuits he filed against Clash, Herman told The Baltimore Sun it has been his goal to "listen to sexual abuse victims and give them a voice".

Herman filed lawsuits on behalf of two plaintiffs against X-Men director, Bryan Singer, the first in 2014, and the second in 2017. The plaintiff in the first case, Michael Egan, was a former child model and actor who accused Singer of repeatedly drugging, threatening and forcibly sodomizing him in the late 1990s, beginning when the boy was 15 years old. "Hollywood has a problem with the sexual exploitation of children. This is the first of many cases I will be filing to give these victims a voice and to expose the issue," Herman said in a statement shortly after filing. Herman filed another series of lawsuits against three more Hollywood executives: former Fox television executive Garth Ancier, theater producer Gary Wayne Goddard and former television executive David A. Neuman. However, within months all four lawsuits were dropped after Michael Egan's stories continued to change and the cases began to fall apart.

Learning of Egan’s discrepancies, Herman withdrew his representation, and he and another former attorney of Egan's, Mark Gallagher, wrote letters of apology to Ancier and Neuman. In his letter, Herman stated he had learned that he had "participated in making what I now know to be untrue and provably false allegations"; accompanying the letters were an undisclosed seven-figure sum. The following year, Michael Egan was sentenced to two years in prison after pleading guilty to unrelated fraud charges. The plaintiff in the second case, Cesar Sanchez-Guzman, filed a lawsuit in the state of Washington against Singer, alleging that he had been raped at age 17 by the director in 2003. Singer denied the allegations and removed himself from the public eye. In June 2019, Singer agreed to pay $150,000 to settle the case, which was approved by Sanchez-Guzman's bankruptcy trustee Nancy James, citing the absence of evidence that Singer attended the yacht party where the alleged assault took place. Singer's attorney Andrew Brettler said that Singer has maintained his innocence and that the "decision to resolve the matter with the bankruptcy trustee was purely a business one".

In 2015, Herman wrote an op-ed piece for Reuters about bringing down powerful men accused of rape. In the piece, he said the role of the internet in sexual abuse cases is changing and it can play a positive, equalizing role enabling victims to come forward and speak up in support of others.

== Controversies ==
In 2012, Herman's pursuit of a case against a rabbi stirred controversy, with participants in various internet forums asserting that Herman, as an observant Jew, was "bringing unwarranted shame on the Orthodox community".

In facing high-profile lawsuits, a couple of representatives for the defendants sued by individuals represented by Herman have objected to his public commentary around their cases. In 2015, Bryan Singer's attorney criticized Herman for holding a press conference regarding the case, accusing Herman of "seeking to get his 15 minutes of fame" and saying "Attorneys who try cases don't hold press conferences". Entertainment lawyer Jonathan Handel, who wrote a number of articles about Singer, wrote in a 2017 piece in The Hollywood Reporter that Herman was disciplined for two incidents of misconduct involving dishonesty, including a 1998 incident in which an Oregon District Judge had reportedly barred Herman and another colleague permanently from his courtroom following findings of alleged misrepresentations. Herman disputed the matter as a misunderstanding related to the date a court order had taken effect for his client.

== Recognition ==
Jeff Herman has been recognized as a leading trial lawyer by the National Trial Lawyers Association, citing his representation of more than one thousand brave men, women, and children in his work over his career. His law firm, Herman Law, is also widely recognized as one of the nation’s leading firms for victims of sexual abuse.

In 2013, Jeff Herman was named "Child Advocate of the Year" by KidSafe Foundation during their 4th Annual Fundraiser. In reporting the award, the Observer noted that Herman has been "recognized for his unique child forensic interviewing technique, and he trains professionals from various child welfare organizations on how to help sexually abused children heal through disclosure". He has been referred to in the media as the "Dark Knight", fighting for the most vulnerable victims. Herman has also been referred to as the "legal eagle" and the "Go-To-Guy" for sexual abuse lawsuits.

While on MSNBC discussing the Jerry Sandusky sex abuse scandal, Herman coined the term "pedophile speak", describing the way pedophiles talk about and justify abusing children. While discussing the sexual abuse lawsuits he filed against Kevin Clash, Herman told The Baltimore Sun it has been his goal to "listen to sexual abuse victims and give them a voice". In an op-ed piece for Reuters about bringing down powerful men accused of rape, Herman said the role of the internet in sexual abuse cases is changing and it can play a positive, equalizing role enabling victims to come forward and speak up in support of others.

In 2024, Herman was inducted into the Society of Benchers, the highest honor bestowed by the Case Western Reserve University School of Law. The award recognizes distinguished alumni for their professional achievements and contributions to the legal field. Herman was honored for his nationally recognized work as a trial attorney representing survivors of sexual abuse and his advocacy for trauma-informed legal practices.

== Personal life ==
Herman is a practicing member of the Jewish faith and father of six children. In 2008, the Miami Herald profiled Herman and reported on his greatest weakness: red meat. Herman is also an avid collector of wine and single malt scotch.
