= Navarre, Ohio =

- Village
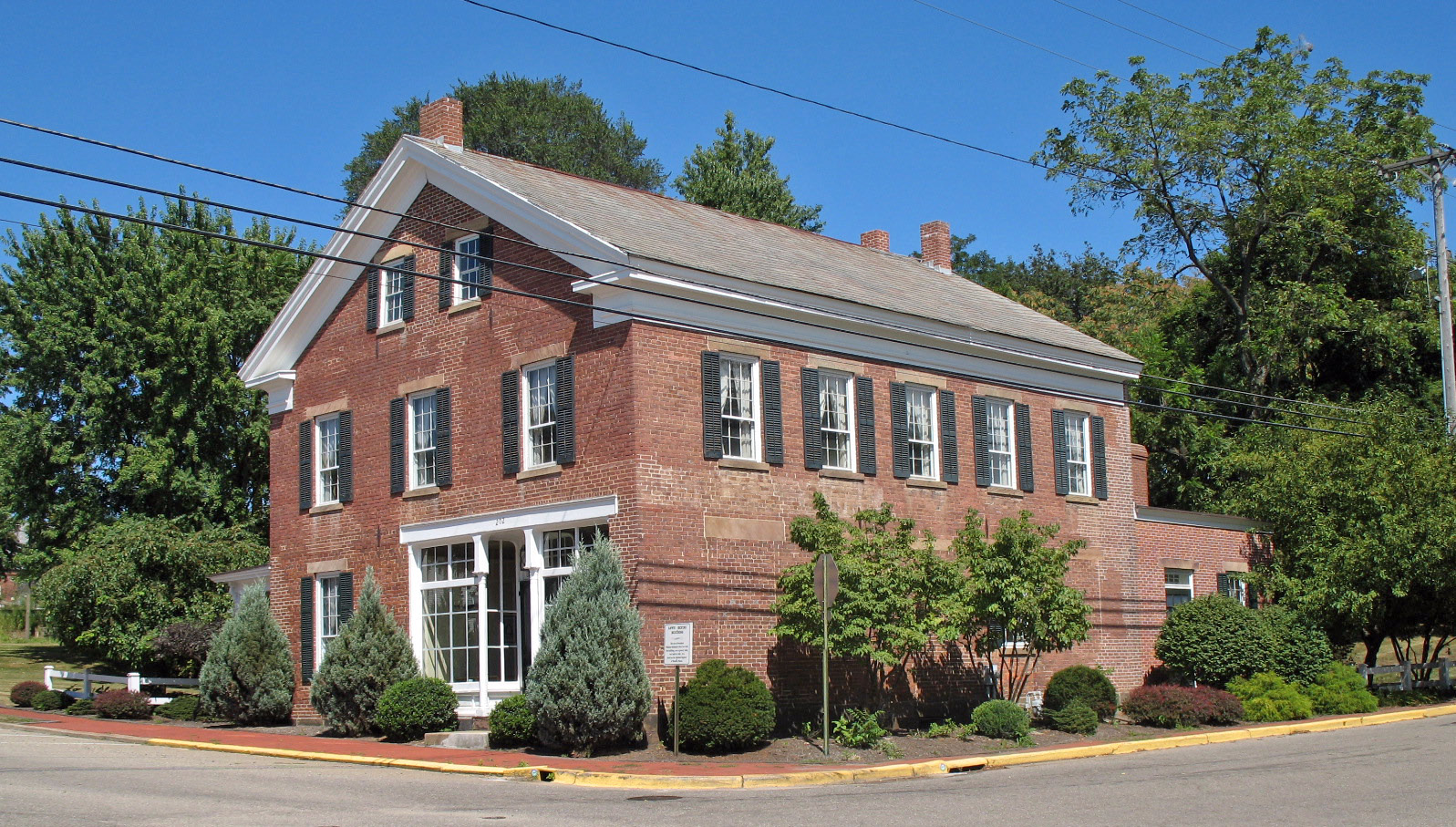
- Loew-Define Grocery Store and Home

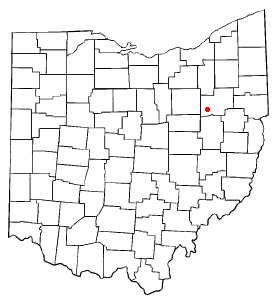
- Location of Navarre, Ohio

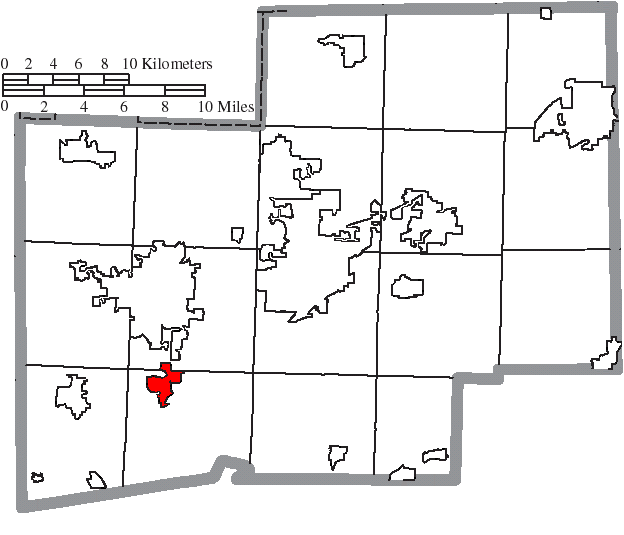
- Location of Navarre in Stark County
- Coordinates: 40°43′45″N 81°30′27″W
- Country: United States
- State: Ohio
- County: Stark

Area
  - Total: 1.78 sq mi (4.62 km^{2})
  - Land: 1.78 sq mi (4.61 km^{2})
  - Water: 0.0039 sq mi (0.01 km^{2})
- Elevation: 961 ft (293 m)

Population (2020)
  - Total: 1,846
  - Density: 1,037.9/sq mi (400.74/km^{2})
- Time zone: UTC-5 (Eastern (EST))
  - Summer (DST): UTC-4 (EDT)
- ZIP code: 44662
- Area code: 330
- FIPS code: 39-53690
- GNIS feature ID: 2399439
- Website: www.navarreohio.net

Navarre is a village in southwestern Stark County, Ohio, United States. The population was 1,846 at the 2020 census. It is part of the Canton–Massillon metropolitan area.

== History ==
The village is named after the Navarre region in Spain.

== Geography ==
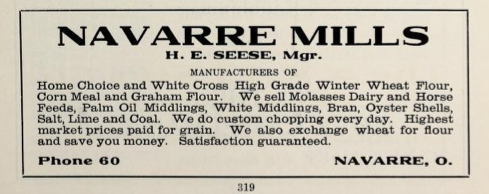
1915 advertisement for Navarre Mills

Navarre is located along the Tuscarawas River.

According to the United States Census Bureau, the village has a total area of 2.05 square miles (5.31 km^{2}), all land.

== Demographics ==
Historical population
Census	Pop.	Note	%±
1880	867		—
1890	1,010		16.5%
1900	963		−4.7%
1910	1,357		40.9%
1920	1,385		2.1%
1930	1,593		15.0%
1940	1,703		6.9%
1950	1,763		3.5%
1960	1,698		−3.7%
1970	1,607		−5.4%
1980	1,343		−16.4%
1990	1,635		21.7%
2000	1,440		−11.9%
2010	1,957		35.9%
2020	1,846		−5.7%
U.S. Decennial Census

=== 2010 census ===
As of the census of 2010, there were 1,957 people, 868 households, and 501 families living in the village. The population density was 954.6 inhabitants per square mile (368.6/km^{2}). There were 935 housing units at an average density of 456.1 per square mile (176.1/km^{2}). The racial makeup of the village was 98.2% White, 0.7% African American, 0.1% Native American, 0.2% Asian, 0.1% Pacific Islander, 0.1% from other races, and 0.8% from two or more races. Hispanic or Latino of any race were 0.7% of the population.

There were 868 households, of which 22.8% had children under the age of 18 living with them, 42.2% were married couples living together, 10.0% had a female householder with no husband present, 5.5% had a male householder with no wife present, and 42.3% were non-families. 37.7% of all households were made up of individuals, and 18.5% had someone living alone who was 65 years of age or older. The average household size was 2.10 and the average family size was 2.74.

The median age in the village was 48.9 years. 17.7% of residents were under the age of 18; 6% were between the ages of 18 and 24; 20.8% were from 25 to 44; 29% were from 45 to 64; and 26.2% were 65 years of age or older. The gender makeup of the village was 47.2% male and 52.8% female.

=== 2000 census ===
As of the census of 2000, there were 1,441 people, 606 households, and 369 families living in the village. The population density was 957.8 inhabitants per square mile (369.8/km^{2}). There were 649 housing units at an average density of 431.7 per square mile (166.7/km^{2}). The racial makeup of the village was 98.89% White, 0.35% African American, 0.07% Pacific Islander, and 0.69% from two or more races. Hispanic or Latino of any race were 0.07% of the population.

There were 606 households, out of which 24.3% had children under the age of 18 living with them, 48.5% were married couples living together, 8.6% had a female householder with no husband present, and 39.1% were non-families. 35.8% of all households were made up of individuals, and 19.1% had someone living alone who was 65 years of age or older. The average household size was 2.20 and the average family size was 2.83.

In the village, the population was spread out, with 19.4% under the age of 18, 7.3% from 18 to 24, 22.8% from 25 to 44, 24.4% from 45 to 64, and 26.0% who were 65 years of age or older. The median age was 45 years. For every 100 females there were 82.3 males. For every 100 females age 18 and over, there were 78.2 males.

The median income for a household in the village was $33,382, and the median income for a family was $41,515. Males had a median income of $30,772 versus $22,778 for females. The per capita income for the village was $18,246. About 4.5% of families and 5.7% of the population were below the poverty line, including 8.1% of those under age 18 and 3.2% of those age 65 or over.

== Notable people ==
- Mark Kozelek, singer-songwriter for the Red House Painters and Sun Kil Moon
- Orlando Metcalfe Poe, Union Army officer and engineer
- John Thomas (1857–1936), member of Ohio House of Representatives, mayor of Navarre
- Lou "Blue Lou" Marini (The Blues Brothers) was raised in Ohio and graduated from Fairless High School near Navarre
