= Fred Norbert Kelly =

American choreographer (1916–2000)

- Born: June 29, 1916; Pittsburgh, Pennsylvania, U.S.
- Died: March 15, 2000 (aged 83); Tucson, Arizona, U.S.
- Education: University of Pittsburgh
- Occupations: Choreographer; dancer; actor; director
- Spouse: Dorothy Greenwalt (died 1995)

Fred Norbert Kelly (June 29, 1916 – March 15, 2000) was an American choreographer, dancer, actor and director.

== Early life ==
Born in Pittsburgh, Pennsylvania, in 1916, Kelly was the youngest of five children of James Patrick Kelly and his wife, Harriet. His father was a sales executive with Thomas Edison's phonograph company, and his mother worked with stock theater as a hobby. She ensured that all of the children took lessons in music and dancing.

Kelly began his dance career at the age of four performing with his older siblings known as The Five Dancing Kellys, including famed American actor and dancer Gene Kelly. He began to teach dance at thirteen years old at the family owned Gene Kelly Studio after learning to tap dance from legend Bill "Bojangles" Robinson.

As a teenager, Kelly traveled around Ohio, Pennsylvania, and West Virginia as a magician with two assistants. He also worked on a showboat each summer of his eighth-12th grade years. He attended the University of Pittsburgh and graduated in 1939.

== Stage career ==
Kelly performed with his older brother Gene as one of the "Kelly Brothers" in Vaudeville. In 1940 Fred replaced Gene in the Broadway production The Time of Your Life written by William Saroyan, in the role of "Harry the Hoofer" for which he won three Donaldson Awards (precursors of the Tony Awards) for this role—one for acting, one for choreography and one for comedy. He also appeared in the Broadway version of This Is the Army.

== Military ==
After Pearl Harbor, Fred enlisted in the Army and served from 1942 to 1945. He was chosen by Irving Berlin to work on the This is the Army production as choreographer and dancer. While performing Kelly also served as head of the medical detachment and was pressed into service in hospitals in England at the beginning of the second Blitz and again in Italy when the big push was on at Monte Cassino to push the Germans above Rome.

== Film ==
Fred only performed with his brother Gene in one film, Deep in My Heart in 1954 in the musical number "I Love to Go Swimmin' with Wimmen".

== Teaching ==
As a dance instructor, Kelly's students included his brother Gene, to whom he taught tap dancing. He also taught ballroom dancing to Princess Elizabeth and Princess Margaret while he worked with a traveling dance unit during his time in the Army. Kelly operated a dance studio in Oradell, New Jersey, for 25 years.

== Personal life ==
Kelly was married to Dorothy Greenwalt. His obituary in The New York Times related that their meeting formed the basis for the song "The Boy Next Door" after she told the song's writers the story of how she and Kelly met. They remained married until her death in 1995.

== Death ==
On March 15, 2000, Kelly died of cancer in Tucson at age 83.

== Recognition ==
On April 3, 2004, the University of Pittsburgh dedicated the Fred Kelly Lobby in the Stephen Foster Memorial performing arts center and museum. The university also has a Fred Kelly Award for Outstanding Achievement in Theatre.
