= Jack Fairless =

English football manager

Personal information
- Place of birth: England

Managerial career
- Years: Team
- 1928–1933: Darlington

Jack Fairless was manager of the English football club Darlington from 1928 to 1933.

== Managerial statistics ==
Team	From	To	Record				
Team	From	To	G	W	L	D	Win %
Darlington	August 1928	May 1933	222	85	100	37	38.3
