= Brewster, Ohio =

- Village
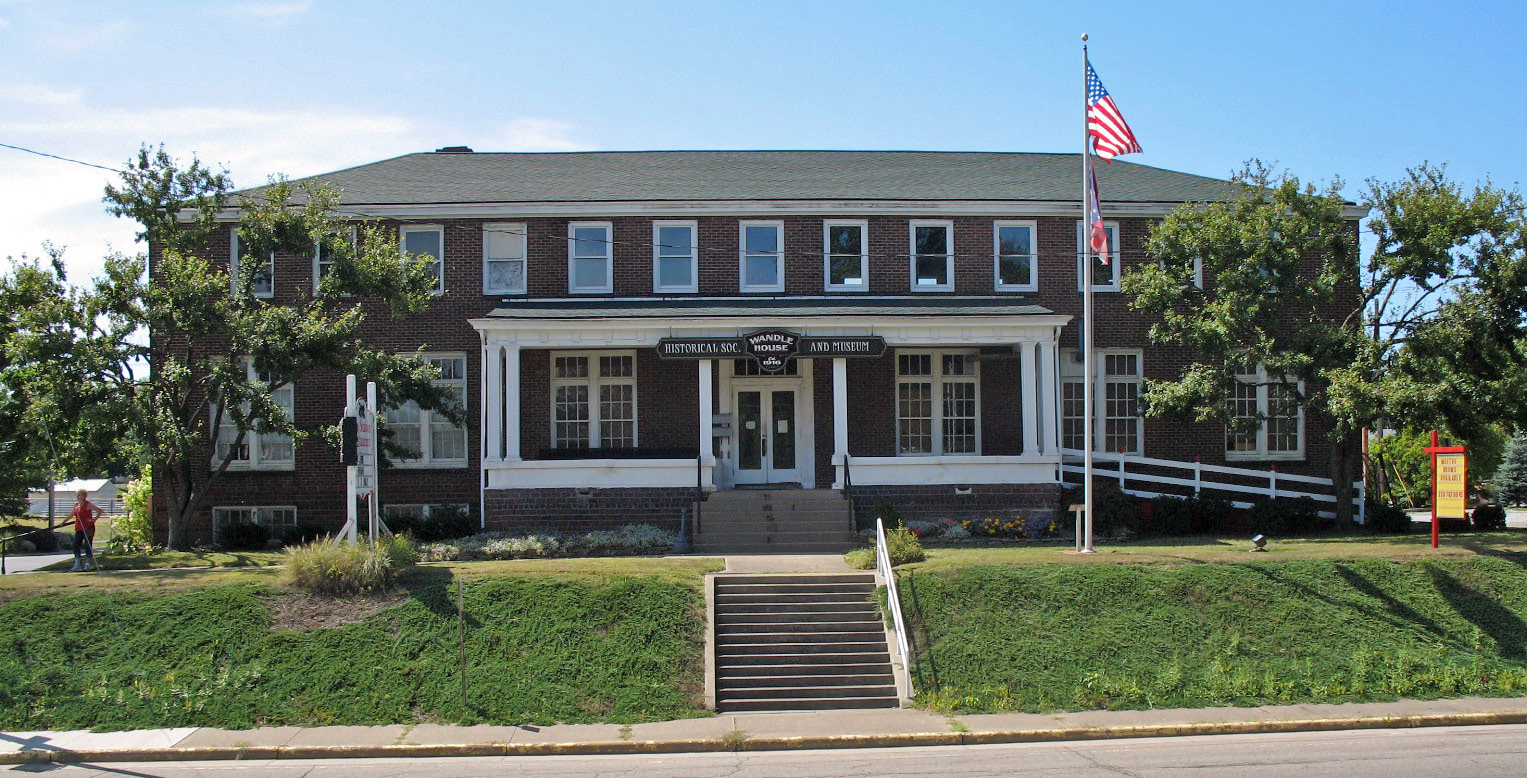
- Brewster Railroad YMCA, built 1916

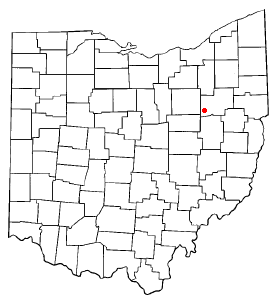
- Location of Brewster, Ohio

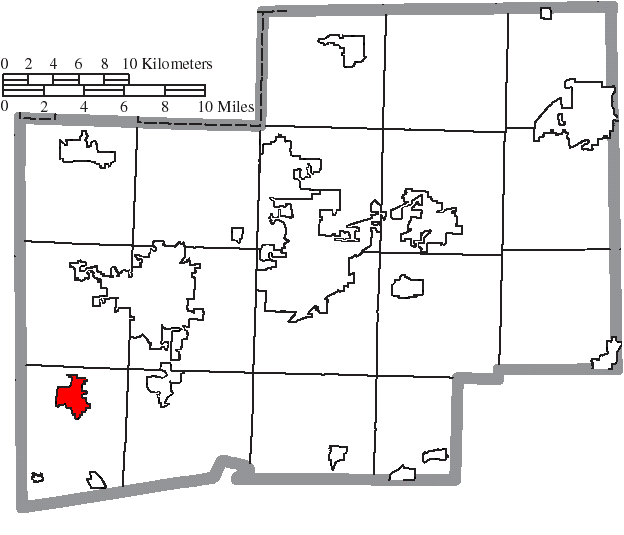
- Location of Brewster in Stark County
- Coordinates: 40°42′49″N 81°35′57″W
- Country: United States
- State: Ohio
- County: Stark
- Township: Sugar Creek

Area
  - Total: 2.27 sq mi (5.89 km^{2})
  - Land: 2.27 sq mi (5.87 km^{2})
  - Water: 0.0077 sq mi (0.02 km^{2})
- Elevation: 981 ft (299 m)

Population (2020)
  - Total: 2,113
  - Estimate (2023): 2,103
  - Density: 932.6/sq mi (360.09/km^{2})
- Time zone: UTC-5 (Eastern (EST))
  - Summer (DST): UTC-4 (EDT)
- ZIP code: 44613
- Area code: 330
- FIPS code: 39-08504
- GNIS feature ID: 2397449
- Website: www.brewsterohio.com

Brewster is a village in southwestern Stark County, Ohio, United States. The population was 2,113 at the 2020 census. It is part of the Canton–Massillon metropolitan area.

== History ==
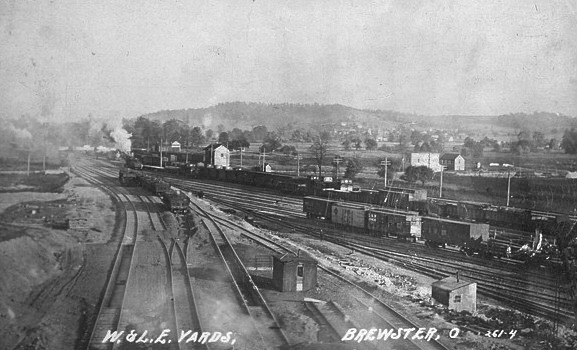
Wheeling and Lake Erie yards, 1910

A post office called Brewster has been in operation since 1910.

Brewster is the location of the corporate headquarters and shops of the Wheeling and Lake Erie Railway, both the historic company and the current regional railroad. The WLE began producing locomotives at its Brewster shops in 1910, and boasted one of the finest steam locomotive producing facilities in the country. Over the years, the WLE built and rolled boilers and erected fifty of their own steam engines, a feat never tried by many larger and more famous railroads. The Wheeling and Lake Erie Brewster Shops continue to perform contract repairs, upgrades and fabrication of locomotives and freight cars to this day.

== Geography ==
Brewster is located along Sugar Creek.

According to the United States Census Bureau, the village has a total area of 2.24 square miles (5.80 km^{2}), of which 2.23 square miles (5.78 km^{2}) is land and 0.01 square miles (0.03 km^{2}) is water.

== Demographics ==
Historical population
Census	Pop.	Note	%±
1920	928		—
1930	1,464		57.8%
1940	1,534		4.8%
1950	1,618		5.5%
1960	2,025		25.2%
1970	2,020		−0.2%
1980	2,321		14.9%
1990	2,307		−0.6%
2000	2,324		0.7%
2010	2,112		−9.1%
2020	2,113		0.0%
2023 (est.)	2,103	▼	−0.5%
U.S. Decennial Census

=== 2010 census ===
As of the census of 2010, there were 2,112 people, 816 households, and 581 families living in the village. The population density was 947.1 inhabitants per square mile (365.7/km^{2}). There were 862 housing units at an average density of 386.5 per square mile (149.2/km^{2}). The racial makeup of the village was 98.5% White, 0.1% African American, 0.3% Asian, 0.5% from other races, and 0.5% from two or more races. Hispanic or Latino of any race were 0.9% of the population.

There were 816 households, of which 31.4% had children under the age of 18 living with them, 54.2% were married couples living together, 11.2% had a female householder with no husband present, 5.9% had a male householder with no wife present, and 28.8% were non-families. 24.0% of all households were made up of individuals, and 12.3% had someone living alone who was 65 years of age or older. The average household size was 2.48 and the average family size was 2.91.

The median age in the village was 42.9 years. 21.4% of residents were under the age of 18; 8.3% were between the ages of 18 and 24; 23.6% were from 25 to 44; 26.7% were from 45 to 64; and 20.1% were 65 years of age or older. The gender makeup of the village was 49.0% male and 51.0% female.

=== 2000 census ===
As of the census of 2000, there were 2,324 people, 855 households, and 630 families living in the village. The population density was 1,146.5 people per square mile (442.0/km^{2}). There were 904 housing units at an average density of 446.0 per square mile (172.2/km^{2}). The racial makeup of the village was 98.97% White, 0.04% African American, 0.17% Native American, 0.17% Asian, 0.09% from other races, and 0.56% from two or more races. Hispanic or Latino of any race were 0.52% of the population.

There were 855 households, out of which 35.7% had children under the age of 18 living with them, 58.8% were married couples living together, 11.1% had a female householder with no husband present, and 26.3% were non-families. 22.2% of all households were made up of individuals, and 12.9% had someone living alone who was 65 years of age or older. The average household size was 2.62 and the average family size was 3.07.

In the village, the population was spread out, with 25.9% under the age of 18, 7.1% from 18 to 24, 28.7% from 25 to 44, 20.5% from 45 to 64, and 17.9% who were 65 years of age or older. The median age was 38 years. For every 100 females there were 94.3 males. For every 100 females age 18 and over, there were 87.6 males.

The median income for a household in the village was $37,853, and the median income for a family was $42,200. Males had a median income of $34,798 versus $20,769 for females. The per capita income for the village was $17,614. About 6.0% of families and 5.9% of the population were below the poverty line, including 2.6% of those under age 18 and 8.0% of those age 65 or over.

== Economy ==
In addition to the aforementioned railroad industry, Brewster is the headquarters for Shearer's Foods, makers of Shearer's potato chips and snacks, and Brewster Dairy, the largest Swiss cheese plant in the US.
