= Stu Kerr =

American television personality

Thomas Stewart "Stu" Kerr (March 9, 1928 – July 17, 1994) was a Baltimore television personality who developed and hosted a number of programs on Baltimore television from 1952 through the 1980s.

Kerr was born in Yonkers, New York and as a teenager worked as an NBC page at the network's Rockefeller Center headquarters. He later recalled "sitting in Lowell Thomas' [sic] seat right after he left, while it was still warm", practicing script reading. His first full-time broadcasting job was on the radio at the age of 19. He was drafted into the U.S. Army in 1950 and saw combat action during the Korean War.

Kerr's television career began in 1952 at WMAR-TV in Baltimore, where he created The Janitor, a late-night show displaying his talent for improvisation. He then played in various children's shows at WMAR-TV, beginning with The Early Riser and Bozo the Clown in the 1960s and, later, inventing the character Professor Kool on his popular Professor Kool's Fun Skool program, which aired Saturday mornings from 1967 to 1977. He was also the weatherman on the early and late evening news programs throughout most of the 1970s. The station's weather set was notable for having hand-movable dials that looked like a digital thermometer and barometer. Kerr also hosted Dialing for Dollars on WMAR-TV until that show ended its 38-year run on Baltimore radio and television in 1977. While playing a "conductor" on the show Caboose in 1978, he discovered Kevin Clash and Todd Stockman.

After leaving WMAR-TV in 1981, he was a weatherman on WJLA-TV in Washington, D.C., and also performed in 54 Space Corps, a puppet show televised on WNUV-TV in Baltimore. For a number of years, he hosted a call-in gardening program, airing Saturday mornings on WCBM radio.

Kerr had a bit part in the 1982 film Diner and small roles in "The Adventure of the Action Hunters" and Morgan Stewart's Coming Home, both filmed in 1987.

He created the recurring character role of "Scoop Toot" on the long-running national network children's program Captain Kangaroo.

Kerr died of multiple myeloma in Baltimore on July 17, 1994.
