= Thomas Kerr Fairless =

English painter (1825–1853)

Thomas Kerr Fairless (1825 – 14 July 1853) was an English landscape-painter.

== Life ==
Fairless was born at Hexham, Northumberland, one of the sons of the antiquary Joseph Fairless. He was a student of the vignette engravings of Thomas Bewick, and for some time worked under Bewick's pupil Isaac Nicholson, a wood-engraver at Newcastle.

Fairless went to London and took up landscape painting, typically of summer scenes in English woods and pastures of England, and sea-views and shipping. From 1848 to 1851 he was an exhibitor at the Royal Academy, the British Institution, and the Suffolk Street Gallery. He was also a teacher of drawing and painting.

In August 1851 Fairless returned in bad health to Hexham, where he died on 14 July 1853, in his twenty-eighth year.
