= Kermit Love =

American puppet designer (1916–2008)

- Love as Willy the Vendor
- Born: Kermit Ernest Hollingshead Love; August 7, 1916; Spring Lake, New Jersey, U.S.
- Died: June 21, 2008 (aged 91); Poughkeepsie, New York, U.S.
- Occupations: Puppet maker; puppeteer; costume designer; actor
- Years active: 1935–2008
- Partner: Christopher Lyall

Kermit Ernest Hollingshead Love (August 7, 1916 – June 21, 2008) was an American puppet maker, puppeteer, costume designer, and actor in children's television and on Broadway. He was best known as a designer and builder with the Muppets, in particular those on Sesame Street.

== Early life ==
Love was born in Spring Lake, New Jersey on August 7, 1916, to Ernest and Alice Love. He was raised by his grandmother and great-grandmother following his mother's death when he was three years old.

== Career ==
=== Theater ===
Love began his theatrical career working as a marionette maker for a federal Works Progress Administration theater in Newark, New Jersey in 1935. He was also a costume designer for Broadway and other stage productions as in the 1930s, including the Mercury Theatre troupe with Orson Welles. Love also appeared on stage in a bit part as a student for the 1937 play Naught Naught 00.

Love worked with many of the great figures of mid-century Broadway and American ballet. He was the costumer for the Agnes de Mille ballet Rodeo (1942), for the Kurt Weill musical One Touch of Venus (1943), and for Merce Cunningham's The Wind Remains (1943) and Jerome Robbins's ballet Fancy Free (1944). For George Balanchine he designed, amongst other items, a 28 ft (8.5 m) marionette giant for Don Quixote (1965).

=== Jim Henson and the Muppets ===
During the early 1960s, Love first crossed paths with Jim Henson through Don Sahlin, who urged him to meet with Henson. The three first collaborated on the La Choy Dragon for advertising the chow mein brand, which was a precursor to Big Bird. Love's theatrical background had given him particular skill at handling full body-puppets and tailoring them to allow freedom for the performer's movements. From this, Love went on to build Oscar the Grouch and then Big Bird after a drawing was designed by Henson (though Sahlin had carved the first head). Love talked about how he designed Big Bird to subtly shed feathers in the course of normal movement, "Not unlike a tree shedding leaves in the Fall." He believed this made Big Bird appear more natural to young viewers. Love co-designed Cookie Monster and he designed Mr. Snuffleupagus. He accompanied the Big Bird costume (Love preferred calling it a "puppet") when it traveled overseas for appearances.

Despite popular rumor, Love was not the source of the name of Kermit the Frog; the character was created and named in 1955, before Henson met Love in the 1960s.

Though he also worked on The Muppet Show and The Muppet Movie, Sesame Street was Love's domain, along with Caroly Wilcox, as one of the key supervisors. He portrayed Willy, the hot dog vendor, on Sesame Street. He puppeteered on the special Julie on Sesame Street. For the feature film Sesame Street Presents: Follow That Bird, he served as special Muppet consultant, and appeared in many background scenes as Willy. He co-designed many of the Sesame Street puppets for the early international productions. For the special The Great Santa Claus Switch, he contributed to the giant Thig.

In his memoir The Wit and Wisdom of Big Bird, Caroll Spinney speaks affectionately of Love and his importance to the show, though noting an occasional cantankerous side.

=== Beyond Sesame Street ===
In addition to his work on Sesame Street, Love remained busy as freelancer, creating and building puppets for the non-Henson puppet series The Great Space Coaster.

One of his specials was watched by a young Kevin Clash, whose parents contacted Love and told him about their son. Love worked as a mentor to Clash and introduced him to Jim Henson, and helped Clash get jobs on children's shows The Great Space Coaster and Captain Kangaroo. After both shows were canceled, Clash moved on to Sesame Street. Other works included building the Snuggle Bear puppet for the Snuggle fabric softener advertisements.

Love appeared as Santa Claus on the cover of New York magazine in December 1982, 1984, and 1985.

Going into semi-retirement in the 1990s, Love remained active, building many full-body puppets for the Joffrey Ballet's The Nutcracker performances, such as designing the mice and the 16 ft (4.9 m)-tall Mother Ginger puppet, an association that continued to 2004. In 1993, he directed the Whirligig pilot for PBS at The Studios at Las Colinas, Irving, Texas. In 2001, he designed Aza, the bird-like mascot for the Association of Zoos and Aquariums.

== Personal life and death ==
Although he was American, Love often spoke with an English, and sometimes French, accent. He resided in Stanfordville, New York.

Love died on June 21, 2008, of congestive heart failure and pneumonia in Poughkeepsie, New York. He was survived by Christopher Lyall, his partner of 50 years.
