= Studio DC: Almost Live =

- Written by: Matt Leuthe; Steve Millunzi
- Directed by: Krash R. Davenport
- Starring: The Muppets
- Voices of: Jeff Ross; Ogie Banks
- Composer: Bud'da
- Country of origin: United States
- Original language: English
- No. of episodes: 2

Production
- Executive producer: Martin G. Baker
- Producers: Jim Lewis; Kirk Thatcher
- Running time: 22–23 minutes
- Production companies: American English Entertainment; The Muppets Studio; Disney Channel Original

Original release
- Network: Disney Channel
- Release: August 3 – October 5, 2008

Studio DC: Almost Live is the title of a pair of specials that aired on the Disney Channel. The specials are half-hour variety shows featuring The Muppets and Disney Channel stars performing comedy sketches and musical numbers together. The style is similar to that of The Muppet Show. The first special aired August 3, 2008, and was hosted by Dylan and Cole Sprouse. The second special aired October 5, 2008, and was hosted by Selena Gomez.

== Cast ==
=== Muppet performers ===
- Steve Whitmire - Kermit the Frog, Beaker, Rizzo the Rat, Statler, Foo-Foo
- Dave Goelz - Gonzo the Great, Zoot, Waldorf, Dr. Bunsen Honeydew
- Eric Jacobson - Miss Piggy, Fozzie Bear, Animal
- Bill Barretta - The Swedish Chef, Pepe the King Prawn, Dr. Teeth, Rowlf the Dog, Bobo the Bear
- David Rudman - Scooter, Janice, Camilla the Turkey
- Matt Vogel - Camilla the Chicken, Floyd Pepper (puppetry only)
- Jerry Nelson - Floyd Pepper (voice only)
- Bruce Lanoil - Kermit the Frog (assistant puppetry in "Bop to the Top")

Additional Muppets performed by David Barclay, Tim Blaney, BJ Guyer, Lara MacLean, Michelan Sisti, and Paul McGinnis

=== Humans ===
==== The first show ====
Performer	Disney Show & Movie
Dylan Sprouse/Zack Martin; Cole Sprouse/Cody Martin	The Suite Life of Zack & Cody; The Suite Life on Deck
Brenda Song/London Tipton	The Suite Life of Zack & Cody; The Suite Life on Deck; Wendy Wu: Homecoming Warrior
Ashley Tisdale	Phineas and Ferb; The Suite Life of Zack & Cody; High School Musical series
Miley Cyrus	Hannah Montana
Phill Lewis/Mr. Moseby	The Suite Life of Zack & Cody; The Suite Life on Deck
Jonas Brothers	Camp Rock series
Billy Ray Cyrus	Hannah Montana
Jeffrey Ross	

==== The second show ====
Performer	Disney Show & Movie
Demi Lovato	As the Bell Rings; Camp Rock series
Selena Gomez	Wizards of Waverly Place
Sabrina Bryan	The Cheetah Girls series
Kiely Williams	The Cheetah Girls series
Adrienne Bailon	The Cheetah Girls series That's So Raven; Buffalo Dreams
David Henrie	Wizards of Waverly Place; That's So Raven
Jake T. Austin	Johnny Kapahala: Back on Board; Wizards of Waverly Place
Moises Arias	Hannah Montana
Jason Earles	Hannah Montana
Jason Dolley	Cory in the House; Minutemen; Read It and Weep

== The first show (August 3, 2008) ==
=== List of sketches and performances ===
Throughout the special, Disney Channel Stars and Muppets appeared together in skits and musical performances. The following is a list of the performances recorded for the special and aired:

- Kermit the Frog, Miss Piggy and Gonzo the Great acting with the cast of The Suite Life of Zack & Cody (except for Ashley Tisdale and Kim Rhodes).
- The Swedish Chef acted with Gonzo the Great, Brenda Song, Dylan and Cole Sprouse and Phill Lewis.
- Miley Cyrus performing "G.N.O. (Girl's Night Out)" with Dr. Teeth and the Electric Mayhem.
- Ashley Tisdale (from Phineas and Ferb, The Suite Life of Zack & Cody, and High School Musical) singing "Bop to the Top" with Kermit the Frog while battling for center stage with a jealous Miss Piggy.
- Miss Piggy claiming to be "Joan S. Jonas, their long lost sister" to the Jonas Brothers and performing "That's Just the Way We Roll".
- The credits feature a send off by Statler and Waldorf making rude comments about the show such as stating they enjoyed their nap instead of the actual show and, after meeting two female audience members, saying they resemble Zac Efron "except better looking".

=== References to other Disney Channel properties ===
Throughout the special, the Muppets frequently refer to the human performers by the characters that have made them famous:

- During the "Bop to the Top" sketch, Miss Piggy calls Ashley Tisdale "Sharpay" and "Maddie" referring to her most popular roles with Disney Channel in the High School Musical films and The Suite Life of Zack & Cody respectively. Also, Kermit the Frog makes references to High School Musical songs when Ashley Tisdale and Miss Piggy fight. The references include "What I've Been Looking For" (by saying, "...what we've been looking for!"), "Stick to the Status Quo", "We're All in This Together", "Breaking Free", and "Start of Something New". Ashley and Miss Piggy, annoyed, leave to "go to lunch".
- Pepe the King Prawn and Rizzo the Rat make a nod at Billy Ray Cyrus' song "Ready, Set, Don't Go". When Miley Cyrus tells her father she is going on a date with Animal, Pepe the King Prawn and Rizzo the Rat say "Get ready" and "Get set" before Billy Ray shouts "DON'T GO!"

=== References to other Muppet works ===
- Rizzo the Rat tells Miley that the Electric Mayhem has performed with Elton John, Prince, and Garth Brooks. The Mayhem band played with John on The Muppet Show, however they did not actually perform with Prince and Brooks, even though both performers appeared in episodes of Muppets Tonight.
- Mr. Moseby references Kermit's popular song "Bein' Green" in The Suite Life of Zack & Cody sketch. Kermit admits to Mr. Moseby that the goings on of the hotel are chaotic. Mr. Moseby then says "Finally, someone sees it's not that easy being me".

== The second show (October 5, 2008) ==
=== List of sketches and performances ===
Throughout the special, Disney Channel Stars and Muppets appeared together in skits and musical performances. The following is a list of the performances recorded for the special and aired:

- Demi Lovato sings "This is Me" with Beaker (Originally, it was supposed to be Kermit the Frog but Miss Piggy didn't let him).
- The Cheetah Girls performing "Dance Me If You Can" with Miss Piggy.
- Selena Gomez learns the art of comedy from Fozzie Bear.
- Moises Arias and Jake T. Austin learn the art of being a critic from Statler and Waldorf.
- Jake T. Austin also turns Gonzo's girlfriend, Camilla, back into a chicken (she had accidentally been turned into a turkey) showing he's a real wizard unlike Selena and David whom just "act like it on TV".
- Jason Earles and Jason Dolley visit the Swedish Chef's craft services table.
- David Henrie jams with Floyd on the guitar.
- A running gag with skits for Disney Channel shows, except modifying the title a bit. Shows featured included "The Blizzards of Waverly Place" (Wizards of Waverly Place), "Banana Montana" (Hannah Montana), and "High Stool Musical" (High School Musical).
- And in the end credits, Miss Piggy goes into Zac Efron's trailer, and looks for him.
- David Henrie teaches Kermit the Frog how to read the text language in the text Ashley Tisdale sent him.

== Home media ==
A DVD with both episodes on was released in the UK on January 18, 2010 and in Argentina on August 25, 2010. On the DVD there are bonus features including music videos, extended clips and bloopers.
