= Steve Whitmire =

American puppeteer (born 1959)

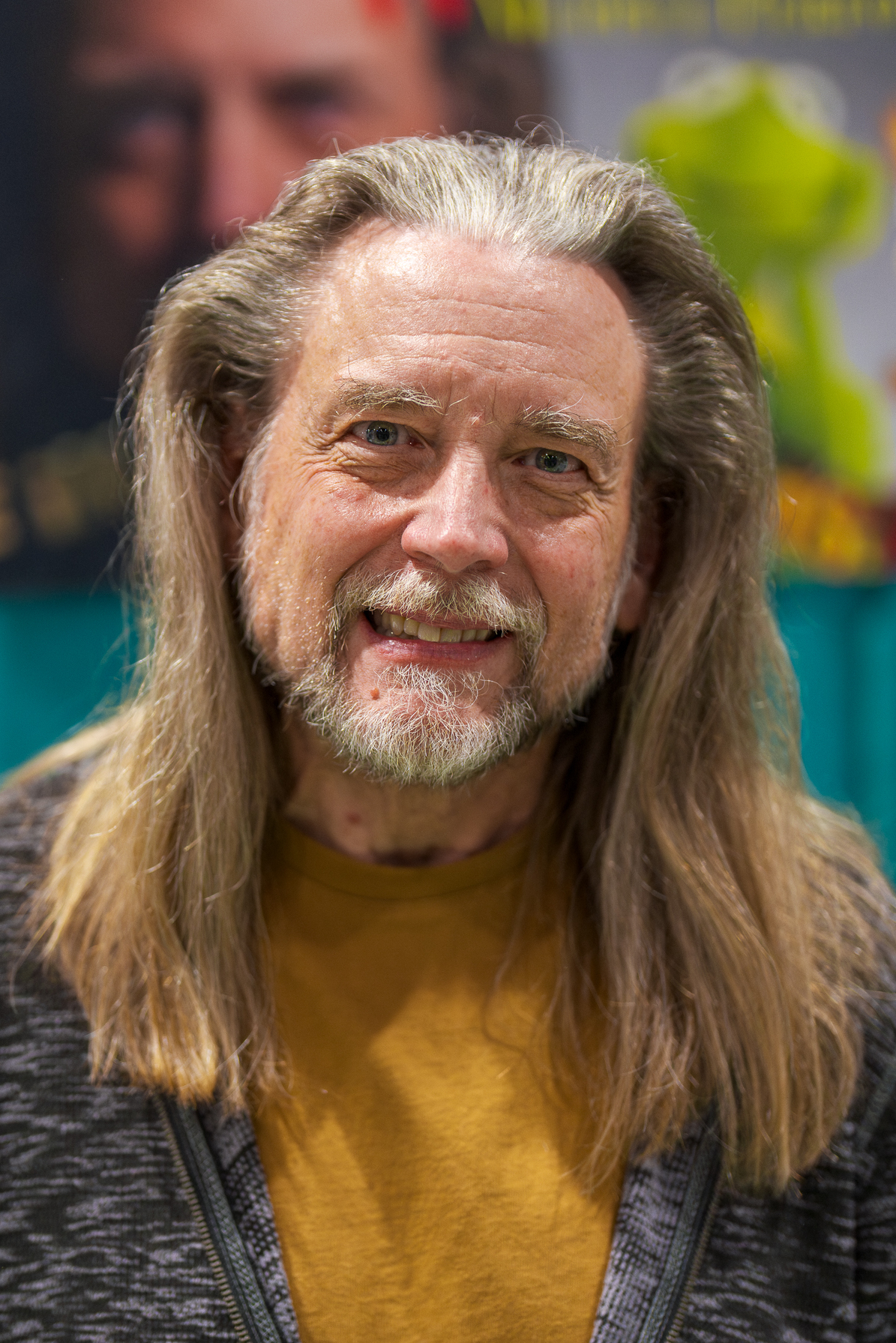
- Whitmire at GalaxyCon Richmond in 2026
- Born: Steven Lawrence Whitmire; September 24, 1959 (age 67); Atlanta, Georgia, U.S.
- Occupation: Puppeteer
- Years active: 1978–present
- Spouse: Melissa Whitmire (m. 1978)
- Website: stevewhitmire.website

Steven Lawrence Whitmire (born September 24, 1959) is an American puppeteer, known primarily for his work with the Jim Henson Company, Sesame Workshop, and the Muppets Studio. Beginning his involvement with the Muppets in 1978, Whitmire originated the roles of Rizzo the Rat, Lips, Wembley Fraggle, and Bean Bunny. He also inherited the roles of Kermit the Frog and Ernie after Jim Henson's death in 1990; he performed the characters until 2016 and 2014, respectively. In later years, he took over several more roles and performed Statler, Link Hogthrob, the Muppet Newsman and Beaker.

== Career ==
Whitmire first appeared voluntarily at a pre-show event at Six Flags Over Georgia. He performed with his then alter-ego puppet Otis for the children waiting to see a multimedia show.

Before graduating high school, Whitmire had his first "professional" puppeteering job using Otis at "The World of Sid & Marty Krofft" in Atlanta, the first indoor theme park. From there Whitmire appeared on local Atlanta TV live for 2 1/2 hours every day on "The Kids Show with Otis" taking telephone calls from children and adults. The show received more than 2000 calls per hour. WATL was owned at that time by former Atlanta children's television host "Officer Don" Kennedy. Otis made appearances on various WATL 36 shows with Atlanta's Ludlow Porch, performing with the Georgia Bulldogs' Larry Munson, Don Kennedy, and Entertainment Page host Artie Goodman. As Otis, Whitmire interviewed Olivia Newton-John during a tour promoting an album.

He worked with puppets after graduating high school, and eventually got a job working on The Muppet Show in 1978. Since then, Whitmire performed in almost every major Henson company project, including non-Muppet projects such as films The Dark Crystal (1982) and Labyrinth (1986), and television series Dinosaurs.

=== Characters performed ===
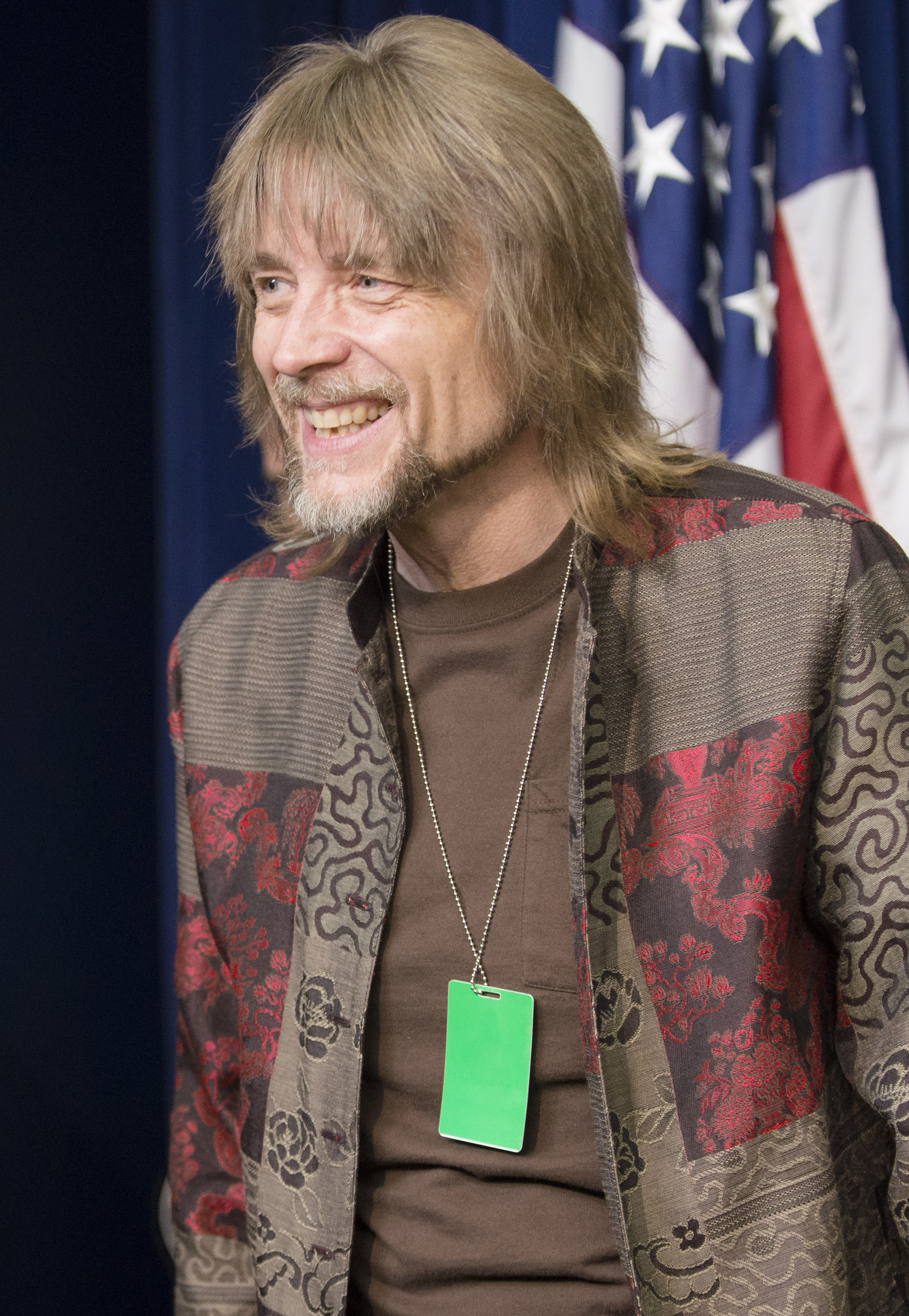
Whitmire in 2014

Whitmire was the second performer of two signature Muppets—Kermit the Frog and Ernie—after the death of their creator and original performer Jim Henson in 1990. Whitmire was personally asked by Brian Henson and Jane Henson to be Kermit's performer a few weeks after Jim Henson's death. Heather Henson arranged for a Kermit puppet to be sent to Whitmire's residence; however, Whitmire hid the puppet away for weeks before deciding on taking on the role. Following Richard Hunt's death and Jerry Nelson's retirement, Whitmire took over the roles of Beaker and Statler, respectively. In 2014, Billy Barkhurst took over the role of Ernie, with Peter Linz taking over that role in 2017. According to Whitmire, the decision to recast Ernie was due to Sesame Street facing budget restructuring at the time and it was getting too expensive to fly him to New York for filming.

Muppet characters original to Whitmire include Rizzo the Rat, Lips (the trumpet player from Dr. Teeth and the Electric Mayhem), Miss Piggy's dog Foo-Foo, Wembley Fraggle and Sprocket the Dog on Fraggle Rock, and Bean Bunny, a character who originated in the television special The Tale of the Bunny Picnic (1986).

Whitmire voiced Link Hogthrob in the Muppet RaceMania and Muppets Party Cruise video games. He also performed Link for the 2011 film The Muppets. This was the first speaking appearance of the character since the death of Jim Henson, the original performer of Link. Whitmire also performed him in the 2014 film Muppets Most Wanted. In 2008, he took over another of Jim Henson's roles, The Muppet Newsman.

=== Dismissal from the Muppets ===
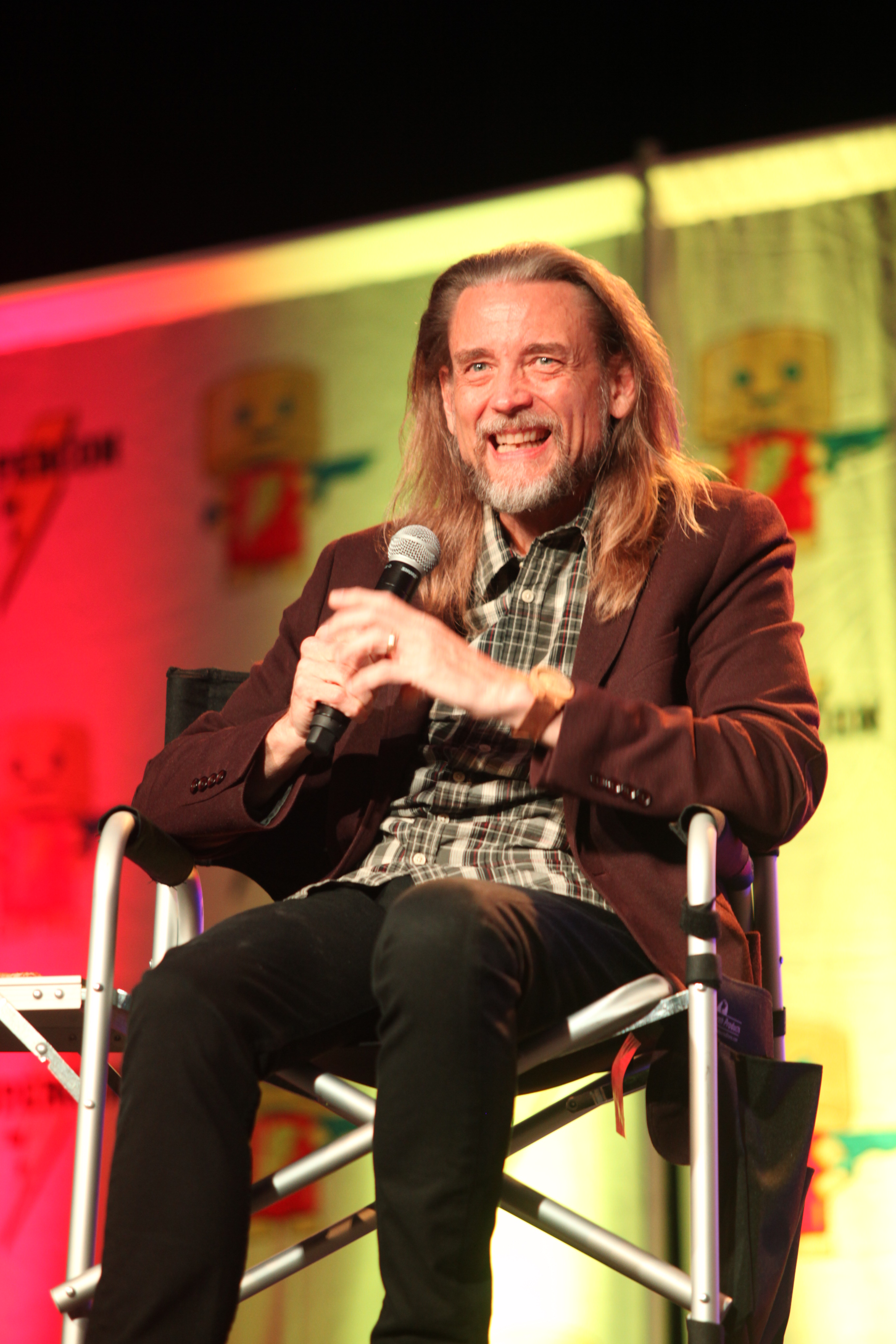
Whitmire at Raleigh Supercon in 2018

In July 2017, the Muppets Studio announced that Whitmire was no longer involved with the Muppets and that fellow Muppet performer Matt Vogel was cast as Kermit's new performer. Whitmire stated that he was dismissed from his roles in October 2016 because of undisclosed issues that he said had not been discussed before his dismissal. In their decision-making, the Muppets Studio's parent company Disney consulted the Henson family, who supported the recasting of Kermit and Whitmire's dismissal.

Brian Henson stated that issues with Whitmire began in the mid-1990s, and that he had warned Whitmire that his behavior needed to stop. He said that Whitmire would make "outrageous demands and often played brinkmanship", mentioning that "Steve would use 'I am now Kermit and if you want the Muppets, you better make me happy because the Muppets are Kermit.' And that is really not OK." He additionally stated that Whitmire would "send emails and letters attacking everyone, attacking the writing and attacking the director". He also expressed guilt for not dismissing Whitmire and recasting Kermit prior to selling the Muppets to Disney in 2004, "because I knew that it was going to be a real problem". Lisa Henson stated that Whitmire was opposed to having an understudy for Kermit and refused to train one, which caused problems when it came to "B-level performances, such as a ribbon-cutting," at some of which she said he was unwilling to appear. She also stated that Whitmire "blackballed young performers" by refusing to appear in shows with them. Cheryl Henson stated: "Steve is very difficult to work with, and it's been many years of being difficult, particularly for the producers".

In an interview with The Hollywood Reporter that same month, Whitmire stated he was dismissed for disagreements over Kermit's characterization and prolonged labor union negotiations between Disney and SAG-AFTRA (of which Whitmire is a member) that delayed his involvement in Muppet productions. Whitmire alleged Disney offered him what he called "consolation prizes" if he voluntarily left, including honoring him as a Disney Legend, under the public pretense he would be retiring from performing. In a statement released to The New York Times, Debbie McClellan, then-head of the Muppets Studio, said that they "raised concerns about Steve's repeated unacceptable business conduct over a period of many years, and he consistently failed to address the feedback". Whitmire expressed an interest in making amends and resuming his role with the Muppets in the future if possible.

In a 2017 episode of the Defunctland Podcast, Terri Hardin, longtime Muppet performer, alleged Whitmire was fired for wanting to retain what he felt was the integrity of Muppet characters, and was smeared as "a diva" and "hard to work with" to justify his firing. In a 2017 interview, Frank Oz stated "with Stevie it's so sad, because the situation with Stevie was a pure business situation, as I understand it. I'd worked with Stevie since he was 18 years old, and on the floor he's terrific. We had a lot of fun. So when he's actually on the floor — I think it was something outside that. And it's very sad."

== Personal life ==
In June 1978, Whitmire married his wife Melissa. They met during his senior year at Berkmar High School in Lilburn, Georgia. They live in Atlanta, Georgia.

== Filmography ==
=== Film ===
Film credits
Year	Title	Role	Notes
1979	The Muppet Movie	Additional Muppet performer, man attending Bogen County Fair (on-screen cameo)	Puppeteer
1981	The Great Muppet Caper	Rizzo the Rat, Lips	Puppeteer/voice
1982	The Dark Crystal	skekTek the Scientist	Puppeteer/voice
1984	The Muppets Take Manhattan	Rizzo the Rat, Gil the Frog, Dog, additional characters	Puppeteer/voice
1985	Dreamchild	The Caterpillar, Mock Turtle	Puppeteer only
1986	Labyrinth	The Four Guards, Firey 4, Ambrosius	Puppeteer only
1987	A Muppet Family Christmas	Rizzo the Rat, Lips, Wembley Fraggle, Sprocket the Dog, and Christmas Turkey	Puppeteer/voice
1990	The Witches	Luke Mouse	Puppeteer Only
1992	The Muppet Christmas Carol	Kermit the Frog, Rizzo the Rat, Bean Bunny, Lips, Sprocket, Beaker, Belinda Cratchit, Laundress, additional characters	Puppeteer/voice
1993	Billy Bunny's Animal Songs	Kermit the Frog	Puppeteer/voice
1996	Muppet Treasure Island	Rizzo the Rat, Kermit the Frog, Beaker, The Dodo, Walleye Pike, Inkspots, Rats	Puppeteer/voice
1997	123 Count with Me	Ernie	Puppeteer/voice
1998	Elmopalooza	Ernie, Kermit the Frog	Puppeteer/voice
1999	Muppets from Space	Kermit the Frog, Rizzo the Rat, Beaker, Bean Bunny, Cosmic Fish #1, Alien Gonzo, Rainbow the Beach Hippie (on-screen cameo)	Puppeteer/voice
1999	The Adventures of Elmo in Grouchland	Ernie, Bad Humor Man, Football Stenchman, Sharon Groan, Stuckweed, Parrot	Puppeteer/voice
1999	CinderElmo	Ernie, Kermit the Frog, and Prince the Dog	Puppeteer/voice
2002	Kermit's Swamp Years	Kermit the Frog, Young Kermit, Chico, Jack Rabbit	Puppeteer/voice
2002	It's a Very Merry Muppet Christmas Movie	Kermit the Frog, Rizzo the Rat, Beaker, Bean Bunny, Mr. Poodlepants	Puppeteer/voice
2005	The Muppets' Wizard of Oz	Kermit the Frog, Rizzo the Rat, Beaker, Statler, Bean Bunny, Audience Member at Aunt Em's Diner (on-screen cameo)	Puppeteer/voice
2007	Mr. Magorium's Wonder Emporium	Kermit the Frog	Puppeteer/voice
2008	Sesame Street: Abby in Wonderland	Ernie (as Tweedledum)	Puppeteer/voice
2011	The Muppets	Kermit the Frog, Beaker, Rizzo the Rat, Statler, Link Hogthrob, The Muppet Newsman, Lips	Puppeteer/voice
2014	Muppets Most Wanted	Kermit the Frog, Foo-Foo, Statler, Beaker, Lips, Rizzo the Rat, Link Hogthrob, The Muppet Newsman, Andy Pig, gulag prisoner (on-screen cameo)	Puppeteer/voice

=== Television ===
Television credits
Year(s)	Title	Role	Notes
1978–1981	The Muppet Show	Rizzo the Rat, Lips, Foo-Foo, Fletcher Bird (voice), additional characters	Performer
1979	The Muppets Go Hollywood	Additional characters, extra	Performer/actor
1979	John Denver and the Muppets: A Christmas Together	Additional characters	Performer
1982	The Fantastic Miss Piggy Show	Rizzo the Rat, back-up singer, additional characters	Performer/actor
1983–1987	Fraggle Rock	Wembley Fraggle, Sprocket, Marlon Fraggle, Flange Doozer, Murray the Minstrel, Papa Tree Creature, Phil Fraggle (puppetry only), Crusty Doozer	Performer
1983	Rocky Mountain Holiday	Rizzo the Rat, Giant Man Eating Chicken	Performer
1986	The Muppets: A Celebration of 30 Years	Rizzo the Rat, additional characters	Performer
1986	The Christmas Toy	Mew	Performer
1986	The Tale of the Bunny Picnic	Bean Bunny	Performer
1987	A Muppet Family Christmas	Rizzo the Rat, Lips, Sprocket, Christmas Turkey, Wembley Fraggle	Performer
1987	Inner Tube	Henry, Duke	Performer, unaired pilot
1989	The Jim Henson Hour	Bean Bunny, Flash, Jacques Roach, Waldo C. Graphic, Yellow Extreme, additional characters	Performer
1990	The Muppets at Walt Disney World	Rizzo the Rat, Bean Bunny, Lips, Foo Foo, Sprocket	Performer
1993–2014	Sesame Street	Ernie (1993–2014), Kermit the Frog (1996–2001; 2009), Dr. Feel and Additional characters	Performer/voice
1990	The Muppets Celebrate Jim Henson	Rizzo the Rat, Bean Bunny, Kermit the Frog	Performer
1991–1994	Dinosaurs	B.P. Richfield (puppetry), Robbie Sinclair (face), Chief Elder (face), Mr. Mason Dixon, Sonny Woody, Blarney, Judge H.T. Stone (puppetry)	Performer/puppeteer
1992–1993	Muppet Meeting Films	Flunky, Mr. Briteweight, Kermit the Frog	Performer
1993	Sesame Street Stays Up Late!	Ernie	Performer
1994	Jim Henson's Animal Show	Jake the Polar Bear, Wingo the Shoebill, Lawrence the Orangutan	Performer
1994	Muppet Classic Theater	Rizzo the Rat, Kermit the Frog	Performer
1995	Mr. Willowby's Christmas Tree	Bear, Kermit the Frog, Owl	Performer
1996–1998	Muppets Tonight	Kermit the Frog, Rizzo the Rat, Beaker, Bean Bunny, Captain Pighead, Andy Pig, Mr. Poodlepants, additional characters	Performer
1998-2009	Elmo's World	Ernie, Kermit the Frog	Performer
2001	Family Feud	Kermit	Performer/Guest Contestant
2002-2007	Play With Me Sesame	Ernie	Performer (Season 1 only and Season 3 for non-US markets, excluding Season 2)
2008	Studio DC: Almost Live	Kermit the Frog, Rizzo the Rat, Beaker, Statler, Bean Bunny, Foo-Foo	Performer
2008	A Muppet Christmas: Letters to Santa	Kermit the Frog, Rizzo the Rat, Beaker, Statler	Performer
2011	WWE Raw	Kermit the Frog, Beaker, Statler	Puppeteer
2012	WWE Tribute to the Troops	Kermit the Frog, Rizzo the Rat	Puppeteer
2012	30 Rock	Kermit the Frog	Puppeteer, Episode: "My Whole Life Is Thunder"
2013	Good Luck Charlie	Kermit the Frog	Puppeteer/Guest Star, Episode: "Duncan Dream House"
2013	Lady Gaga and the Muppets Holiday Spectacular	Kermit the Frog, Beaker, Rizzo the Rat, Statler	Performer
2015	Muppet Moments	Kermit the Frog, Beaker, Rizzo the Rat, Statler, Sheep, Andy Pig, Foo-Foo, The Muppet Newsman	Performer
2015–2016	The Muppets	Kermit the Frog, Rizzo the Rat, Beaker, Statler, Lips, The Muppet Newsman, Andy Pig	Performer
2021	Lego Masters	Willy	Performer, (2 episodes)

=== Video games ===
Video games
Year(s)	Title	Role	Notes
1996	Muppet Treasure Island	Kermit the Frog, Rizzo the Rat, Beaker, Walleye Pike	Voice role
1996	The Muppets CD-Rom: Muppets Inside	Kermit the Frog, Rizzo the Rat, Beaker	Voice role
1999	Sesame Street: Baby and Me	Ernie	Voice role
1999	Elmo's Number Journey	Ernie	Voice role
1999	Elmo's Letter Adventure	Ernie	Voice role
1999	Sesame Street: The Adventures of Elmo in Grouchland	Football Stenchman	Voice role
1999	Sesame Street Music Maker	Ernie	Voice role
2000	Sesame Street: Ernie's Adventure in Space	Ernie	Voice role
2000	Muppet Race Mania	Kermit the Frog, Rizzo the Rat, Beaker, Bean Bunny, Gil, Link Hogthrob, Flange Doozer	Voice role
2000	Muppet Monster Adventure	Kermit the Frog, Rizzo the Rat, Beaker	Voice role
2001	Sesame Street Sports	Ernie	Voice role
2002	Sesame Street Preschool	Ernie	Voice role
2003	Muppets Party Cruise	Kermit the Frog, Rizzo the Rat, Beaker, Andy Pig, Bean Bunny, Link Hogthrob	Voice role
2006	Bert and Ernie's Imagination Adventure	Ernie	Voice role

=== Other appearances ===
Other credits
Year(s)	Title	Role	Notes
1991	Muppet*Vision 3D	Waldo C. Graphic, Bean Bunny, Rizzo the Rat	Performer, theme park film
2005–2006	Statler and Waldorf: From the Balcony	Statler (Ep. 1-8)	Performer
2008–2009	Muppet YouTube Shorts	Kermit the Frog, Rizzo the Rat, Beaker, Statler, Rabbits, Pumpkins, Penguins, Turkey	Performer
2010	Disney's Honorary VoluntEars Cavalcade	Kermit the Frog	Voice, theme park parade
2010	The Muppets Kitchen with Cat Cora	Kermit the Frog, Beaker, Andy Pig, Foo-Foo, The Muppet Newsman	Performer
2013–2014	Muppisodes	Kermit the Frog, Beaker, Rizzo the Rat, Statler	Performer
2014	Disney Drive-On with The Muppets	Kermit the Frog	Performer
2016	The Muppets Present...Great Moments in American History	Kermit the Frog	Voice, theme park show
2019–2022	CAVE-iN	Weldon the I.T. Guy	Performer, Internet videos

Preceded by None	Performer of Rizzo the Rat; 1980–2016	Succeeded by Bradley Freeman Jr.
Preceded by None	Performer of Lips; 1980–2016	Succeeded by Peter Linz
Preceded by None	Performer of Sprocket; 1983-1987	Succeeded by John Tartaglia
Preceded by None	Performer of Wembley Fraggle; 1983–2012	Succeeded by Kevin Clash
Preceded by None	Performer of Bean Bunny; 1986–2009	Succeeded by Bradley Freeman Jr.
Preceded by Jim Henson	Performer of Kermit the Frog; 1990–2016	Succeeded by Matt Vogel
Preceded by Richard Hunt	Performer of Beaker; 1992–2016	Succeeded by David Rudman
Preceded by Jim Henson	Performer of Ernie; 1992–2014	Succeeded by Billy Barkhurst
Preceded by Brian Henson	Performer of Andy Pig; 1996–2016	Succeeded by Bill Barretta
Preceded by Jim Henson	Performer of Link Hogthrob; 2000–2016	Succeeded by Peter Linz
Preceded by Jerry Nelson	Performer of Statler; 2002–2016	Succeeded by Peter Linz
Preceded by Brian Henson	Performer of The Muppet Newsman; 2008–2016	Succeeded by Eric Jacobson
