= Rocky Mountain Holiday =

1983 album by John Denver

- Album cover

Soundtrack album by John Denver and The Muppets
- Released: May 1983
- Genre: Country; folk; soft pop
- Label: RCA Victor
- Producer: Milton Okun; Barney Wyckoff; John Denver

John Denver chronology
Seasons of the Heart (1982)	Rocky Mountain Holiday (1982)	It's About Time (1983)

Professional ratings
Review scores
Source	Rating
Allmusic	3/5 stars

Rocky Mountain Holiday
- Also known as: Rocky Mountain Holiday with John Denver and The Muppets
- Genre: Family film Television special
- Created by: Henson Associates; John-Jer Productions
- Written by: Jon Stone; Joseph A. Bailey
- Directed by: Jim Henson
- Starring: John Denver; Muppet performers: Jim Henson; Frank Oz; Jerry Nelson; Dave Goelz; Richard Hunt; Steve Whitmire; Karen Prell; Kathryn Mullen
- Theme music composer: John Denver
- Country of origin: United States

Production
- Producers: John Denver; Jim Henson Barney Wyckoff
- Editor: Peter Rudoy
- Production company: Henson Associates

Original release
- Network: ABC
- Release: May 12, 1983

Rocky Mountain Holiday is a television special and a soundtrack album of songs from the special, performed by American singer-songwriter John Denver and The Muppets. The show has Denver playing host to the extended Muppet family; he takes them up into the scenic Rockies for an excursion that includes fishing, hiking, and camping. The soundtrack album was released in May 1983, and the special itself aired May 12, 1983, on ABC. In 1984, the album was nominated for a Grammy Award for Best Album for Children, but lost to Michael Jackson's E.T. the Extra-Terrestrial storybook.

== Album track listing ==
1. "Hey Old Pal" – John Denver, Kermit the Frog, Fozzie Bear, and the Cast
2. "Grandma's Feather Bed" – Kermit the Frog and the Cast
3. "She'll Be Coming 'Round the Mountain" – Kermit the Frog, Janice, Sgt. Floyd Pepper, Scooter, Gonzo the Great, Miss Piggy, and the Cast
4. "Catch Another Butterfly" – John Denver
5. "Down by the Old Mill Stream" John Denver and the Cast
6. "Durango Mountain Caballero" – John Denver
7. "Gone Fishin'" - John Denver and Floyd Pepper
8. "Medley: Tumbling Tumbleweeds; Happy Trails" – John Denver and Miss Piggy
9. "Poems, Prayers and Promises"- John Denver and the Cast
10. "Take 'em Away" – The Jug Band
11. "Going Camping" – John Denver and the Cast
12. "Home on the Range" – John Denver and Rowlf the Dog
13. "No One Like You" – John Denver

== Plot ==
John Denver takes the Muppets camping.

== Cast ==
- John Denver as himself

The Muppet performers

- Jim Henson as Kermit the Frog, Rowlf the Dog, Waldorf, and Zeke
- Frank Oz as Miss Piggy, Fozzie Bear, Animal, and Gramps
- Jerry Nelson as Floyd Pepper, Robin the Frog, Camilla the Chicken, and Slim Wilson
- Richard Hunt as Scooter, Janice, Statler, and Bubba
- Dave Goelz as Gonzo the Great, Zoot, and Lubbock Lou
- Steve Whitmire as Rizzo the Rat and the Giant Man-Eating Chicken
- Kathryn Mullen
- Karen Prell

== Home video ==
Rocky Mountain Holiday was released by Sony Pictures Entertainment's Columbia TriStar Home Entertainment division on VHS and DVD on August 26, 2003. A scene from the original broadcast in which Denver pilots a plane with Rowlf the Dog to cure the dog of his hiccups was cut for the home video release, out of respect for Denver who died in a plane crash in 1997.
