= Muppet Treasure Island =

1996 film directed by Brian Henson

- Theatrical release poster by Drew Struzan
- Directed by: Brian Henson
- Screenplay by: Jerry Juhl; Kirk R. Thatcher; James V. Hart
- Based on: The Muppet Show by Jim Henson Treasure Island by Robert Louis Stevenson
- Produced by: Brian Henson; Martin G. Baker
- Starring: Tim Curry; Dave Goelz; Steve Whitmire; Jerry Nelson; Kevin Clash; Frank Oz
- Cinematography: John Fenner
- Edited by: Michael Jablow
- Music by: Hans Zimmer
- Production companies: Walt Disney Pictures; Jim Henson Productions
- Distributed by: Buena Vista Pictures Distribution
- Release date: February 16, 1996
- Running time: 100 minutes
- Country: United States
- Language: English
- Box office: $47.2 million

Muppet Treasure Island is a 1996 American musical swashbuckler comedy film directed by Brian Henson and the fifth theatrical film featuring the Muppets. Adapted from the 1883 novel Treasure Island by Robert Louis Stevenson, similarly to its predecessor The Muppet Christmas Carol (1992), the key roles were played by live-action actors, with the Muppets in supporting roles. The film stars Muppet performers Dave Goelz, Steve Whitmire, Jerry Nelson, Kevin Clash, Bill Barretta, and Frank Oz in various roles, as well as Tim Curry as Long John Silver and introducing Kevin Bishop in his film debut as Jim Hawkins.

The film was released in the United States on February 16, 1996, by Buena Vista Pictures Distribution. It grossed $47 million worldwide. It also received generally positive reviews from critics. It is the second Muppets film to be produced by Walt Disney Pictures, whose parent company would later acquire the Muppets in 2004.

== Plot ==
Jim Hawkins is a young orphan who lives in an inn in England with his best friends, Gonzo and Rizzo. Jim’s father was a first mate who died when he was seven years old. He listens to Billy Bones' tales about the pirate Captain Bernie Flint, who buried his treasure trove on a remote island and executed his crew so only he would own the island's map. One night, Bones' former crewmate, Blind Pew, arrives, and gives Bones the black spot. Before dying of a heart attack, Bones gives Jim the treasure map and begs him to go after the treasure and keep it safe from pirate hands, especially a one-legged man. Bones’ other former crewmates attacks the inn, thus destroying it, but Jim, Gonzo, and Rizzo escape with the map.

The trio takes the map to the half-wit Squire Trelawney (Fozzie Bear), who arranges a voyage to find the treasure. The trio are enlisted aboard the Hispaniola as cabin boys, accompanied by Trelawney, Dr. Livesey (Bunsen Honeydew), and Beaker. The ship is commanded by Captain Abraham Smollett, (Kermit the Frog) who was a friend of Jim’s father, and his strict first mate, Mr. Samuel Arrow (Sam Eagle). The boys meet the cook Long John Silver, the one-legged man whom Bones warned them of, but Jim and Silver become good friends. The ship sets sail, but Smollett is suspicious of the crew, believing them to be shady. After Gonzo and Rizzo are kidnapped and tortured by three of the crew who have turned out to be pirates, Smollett and Arrow imprison them in the brig and have the treasure map locked up for safekeeping.

It is revealed that Silver and the secret pirates want the treasure for themselves. Silver fools Mr. Arrow into leaving the ship to test out a rowboat, tells the crew he drowned, and has his minions steal the map during Arrow's memorial service. Jim, Gonzo, and Rizzo discover Silver's treachery and inform Smollett. Arriving at Treasure Island, Smollett orders the entire crew, save the officers, to go ashore, planning to keep himself and the non-pirate crew aboard the ship and abandon the pirates on the island. However, his plan falls through when it is discovered that Silver has kidnapped Jim to have leverage against the captain.

On the island, Silver invites Jim to join them in the treasure hunt by using his late father's compass. When Jim refuses, Silver forcibly takes the compass from him. Smollett, Gonzo, and Rizzo land on the island in an effort to rescue Jim. However, unbeknownst to them, Silver had hidden a squad of pirates aboard the Hispaniola before leaving, and they capture the ship in Smollett's absence. On the island, Smollett and the rest of the landing party are captured by the native tribe of pigs, where Smollett reunites with his former lover, and the pigs’ queen, Benjamina "Mina" Gunn, (Miss Piggy) who took up with Captain Flint and was abandoned by him on the island after Smollett jilted her.

The pirates find that the cave in which Flint hid his treasure is empty, leading to a brief mutiny. Silver reveals that despite being a pirate, he cares for Jim and allows him to escape. After reprimanding the crew for using a page from the Bible to deliver a death sentence, Silver and his crew capture Smollett and Mina. Smollett is hung from a cliff to fall to his death, joined soon by Mina after she reveals where the treasure is hidden to save his life. Jim rescues his friends and with an alive Mr. Arrow, who portrays his own ghost to scare the pirates aboard the ship. The group regains control of the Hispaniola and rescues Smollett and Mina.

The group engages the remaining pirates in a sword fight on the beach with Sweetums defecting to Smollett's side until only Silver is left standing, but he surrenders when he finds himself outnumbered. While the pirates are imprisoned, Silver discovers that he still has Mr. Arrow's keys and tries to escape with the treasure during the night. Jim confronts him and threatens to give his position away, while Silver draws his pistol. Neither of them can bring themselves to follow their threats, so Jim allows Silver to leave as long as they never cross paths again. Silver rows away, but not before returning Jim's compass to him and complimenting his kind heart. However, Mr. Arrow informs Jim and Smollett that the boat Silver used was not seaworthy, and Silver is later stranded on Treasure Island.

Jim becomes the honorary captain of the Hispaniola, which sails back to England, but not before some scuba-diving rat tourists Rizzo brought to the ship earlier recover the treasure from the sea.

== Cast ==
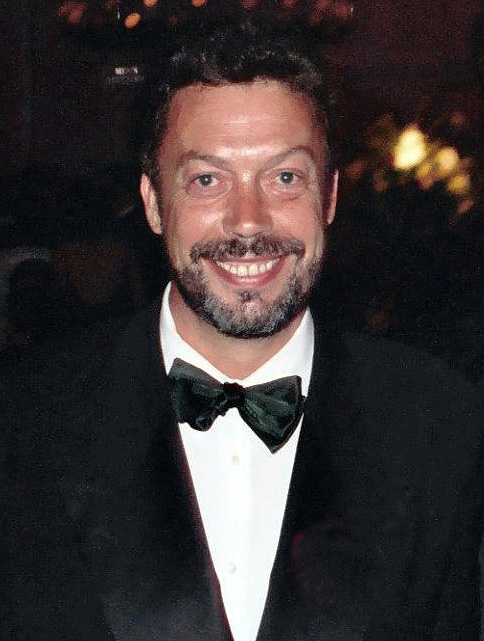
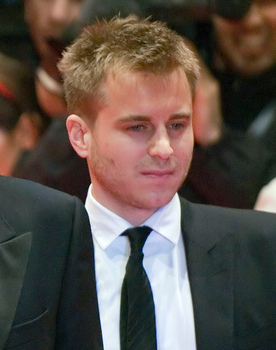
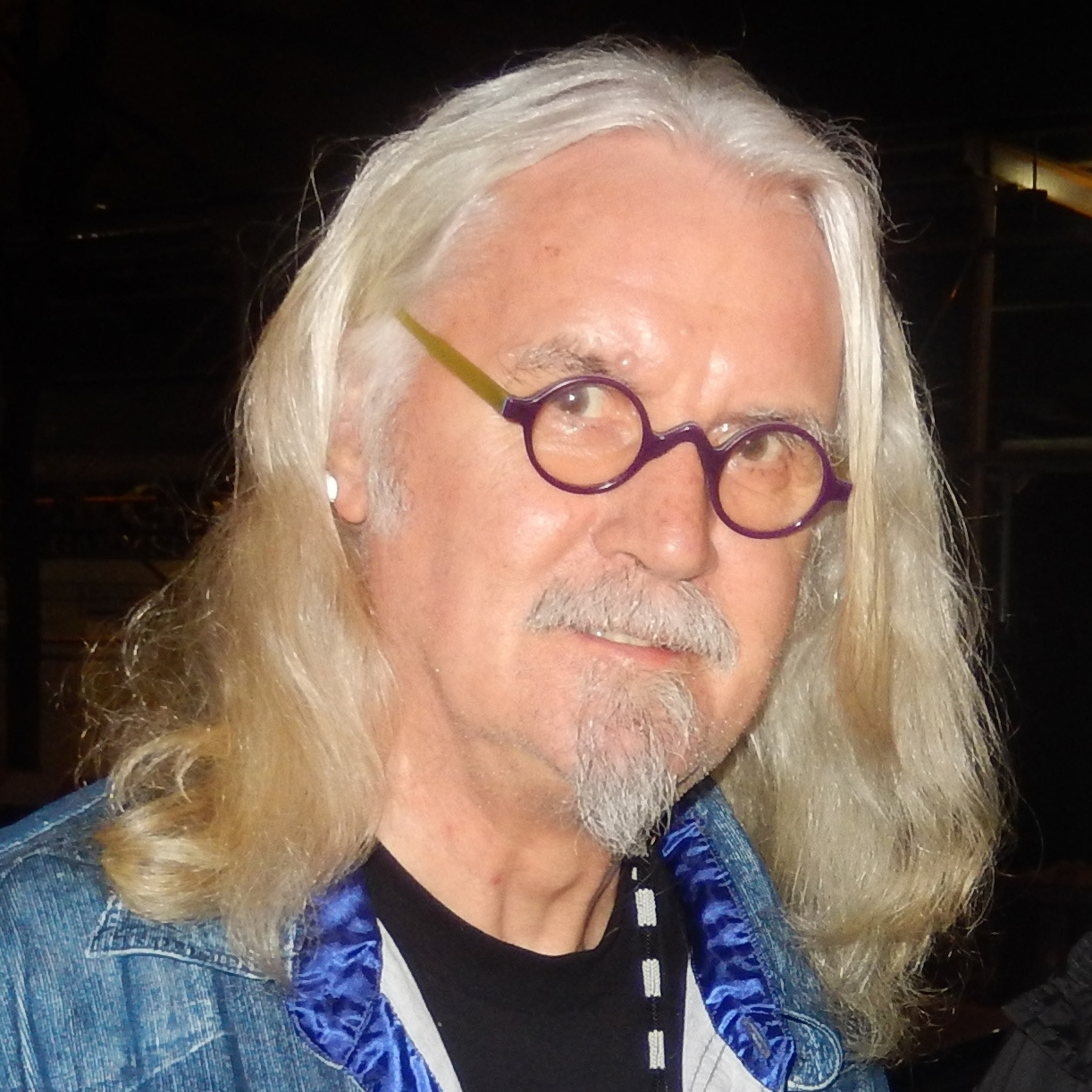
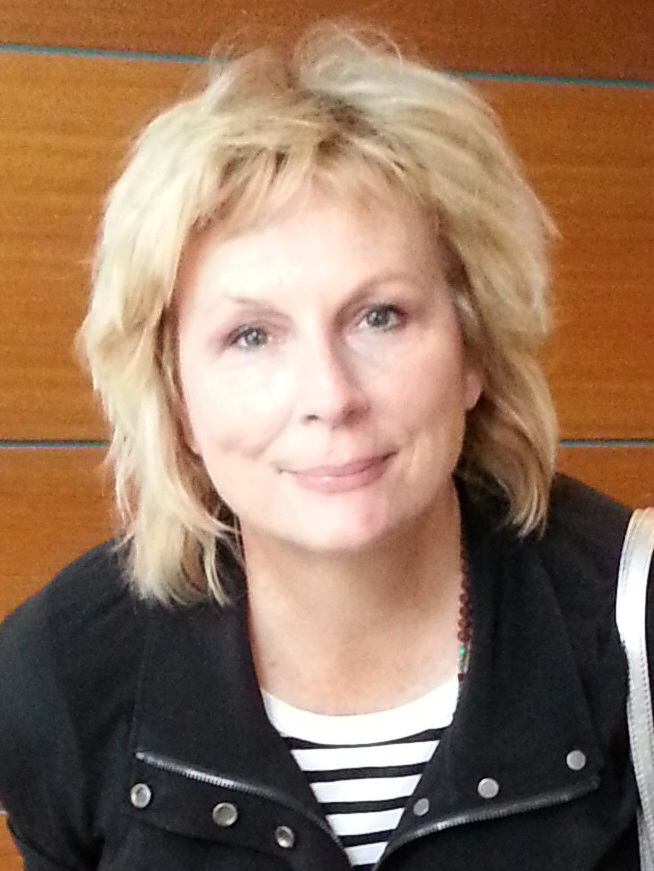
The human cast of Muppet Treasure Island (from left to right) Tim Curry (pictured in 1995), Kevin Bishop (2007), Billy Connolly (2016) and Jennifer Saunders (2014).
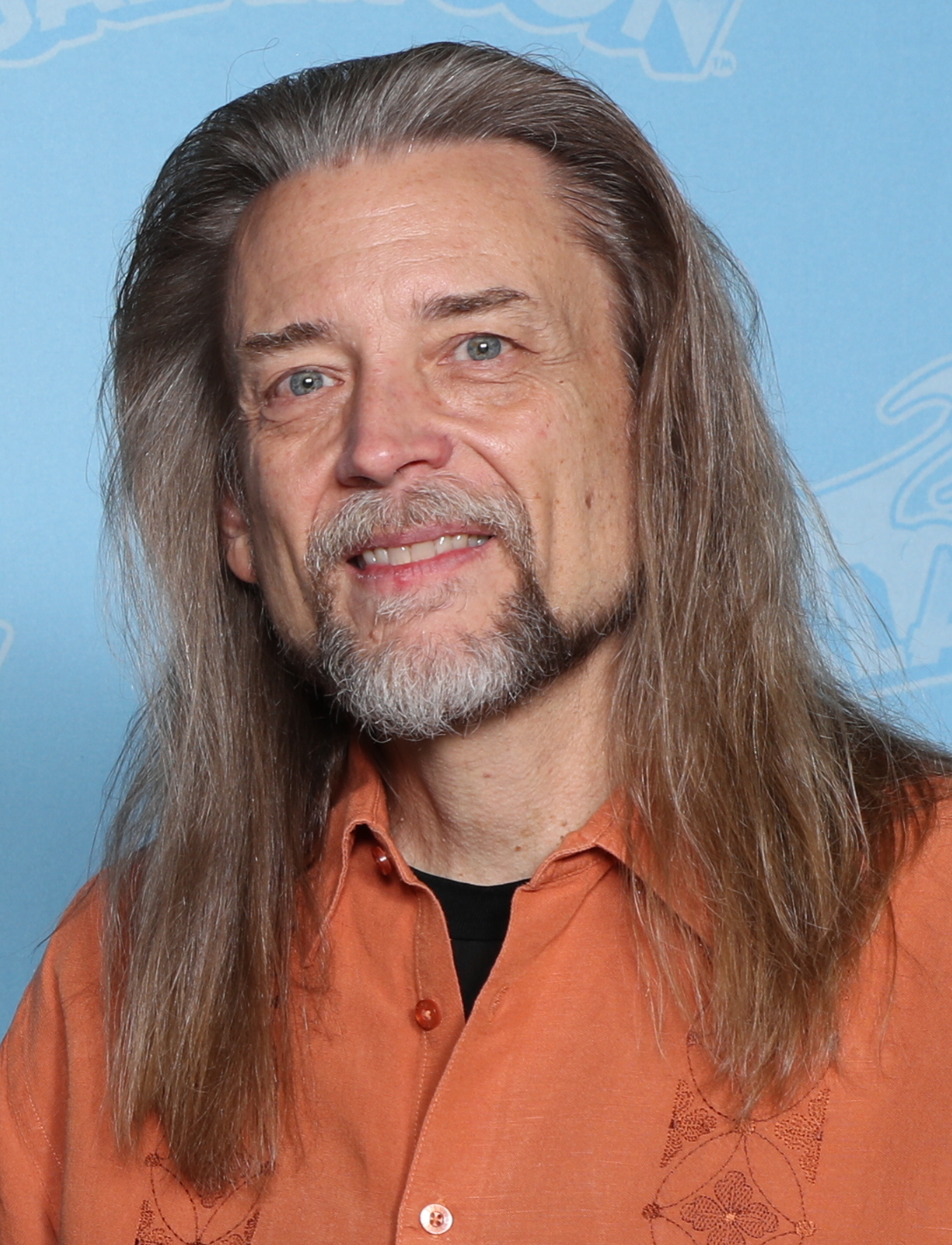
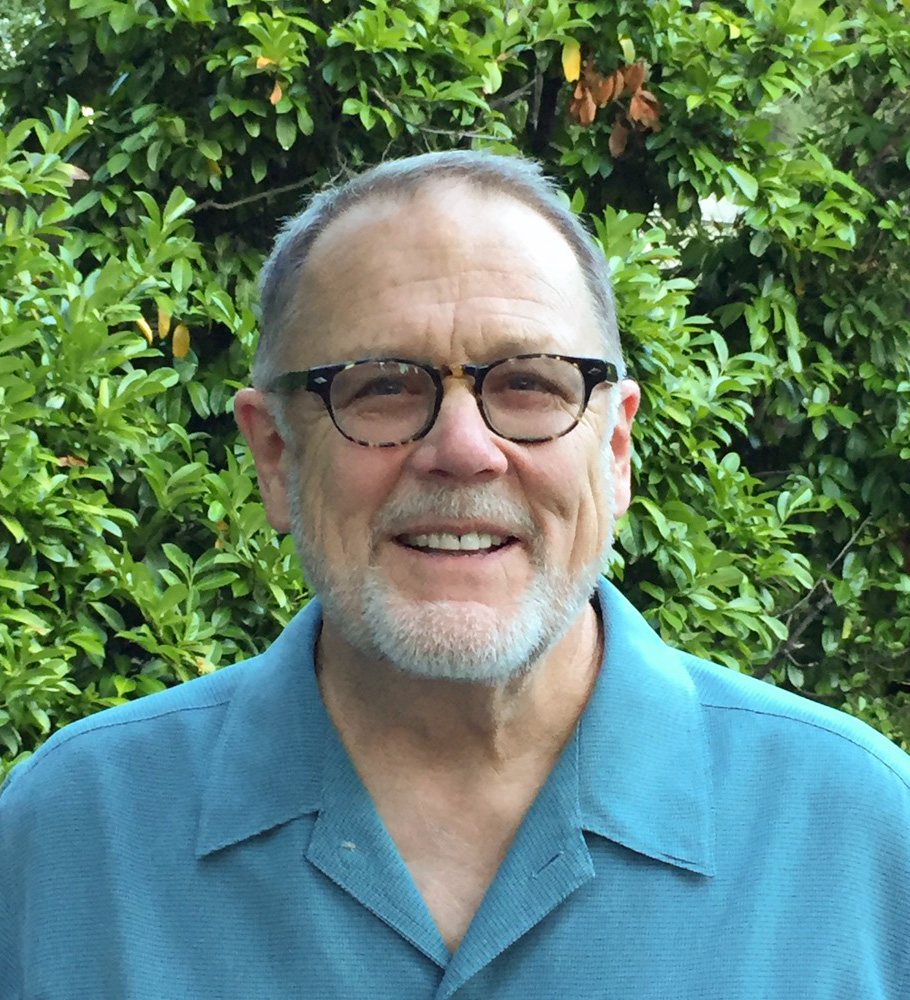
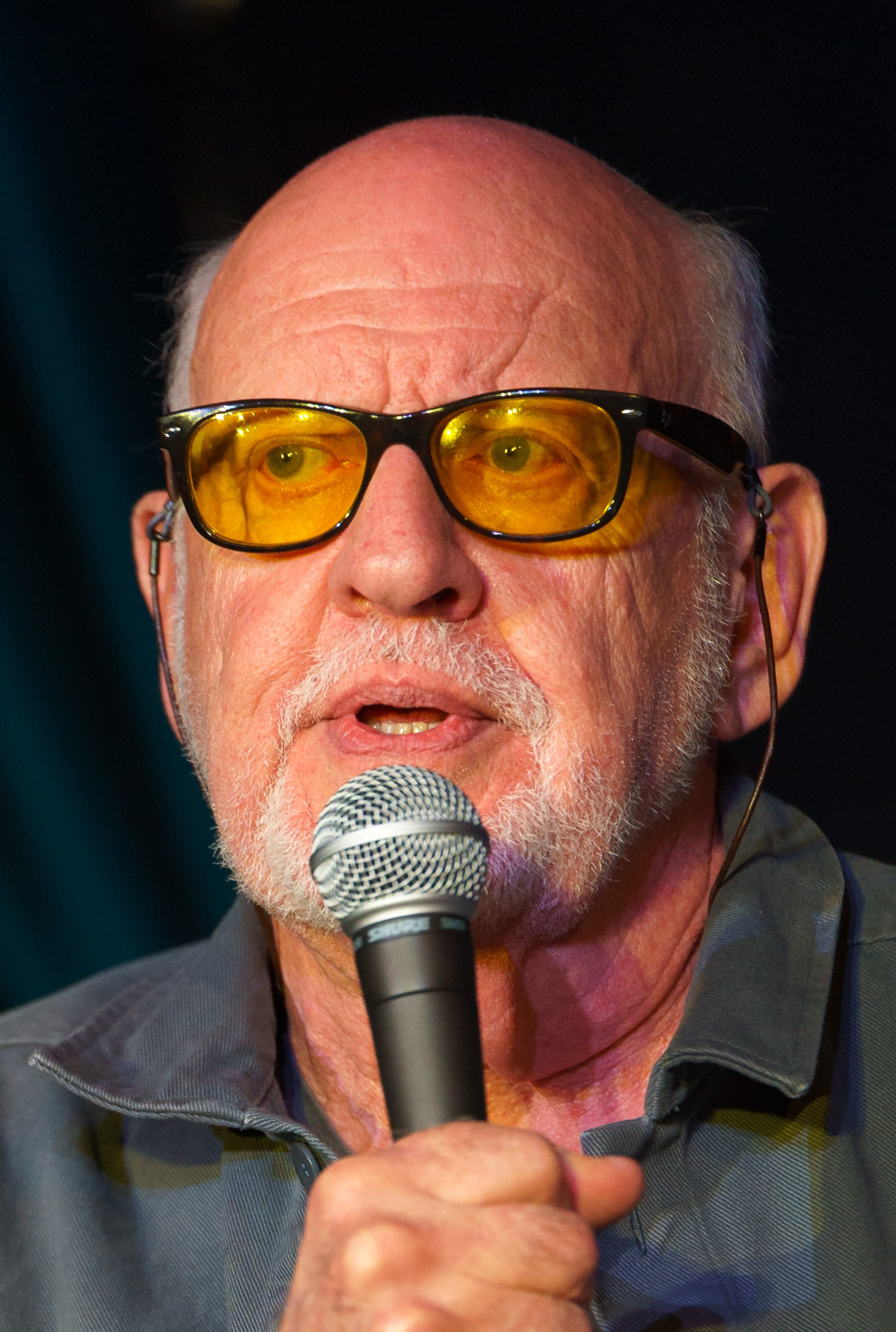
Muppet performers Steve Whitmire (2019), Dave Goelz (2018), and Frank Oz (2024).
- Kevin Bishop as Jim Hawkins, a friendly orphan boy who, for most of his life, has worked at the Admiral Benbow Inn under the strict rule of Mrs. Bluveridge, but has always dreamed of daring adventures. He is very naïve, which proves to be somewhat of a problem for him, as he forms a friendship with Long John Silver, who is ultimately revealed to be a pirate.
- Tim Curry as Long John Silver, a duplicitous but smooth-talking pirate, posing as a chef, who mentors Jim until he is overheard by Gonzo, Rizzo and Jim as he reveals his plans to take over the Hispaniola. During his siege on Treasure Island, it is suggested that Silver and Benjamina Gunn share a romantic history. Despite his evil nature, he cares about Jim.
- Billy Connolly as Billy Bones, an ex-pirate, previously a member of Captain Flint's crew who witnessed the burial of gold on Treasure Island and informs Jim that he still has the map to the treasure before he suffers a fatal heart attack.
- Jennifer Saunders as Mrs. Sarah Bluveridge, an intimidating, feisty woman who owns the Admiral Benbow Inn where Jim and his friends work. She has an uncanny ability to hear conversations from far away, which leads to various characters exclaiming "How does she do that?" Though strict with the boys, she does show genuine love for Jim and his friends, helping them escape the pirates before fighting them off herself.
- David Nicholls as Captain Flint, a pirate who buried the treasure at his own island years ago, and killed his crew to prevent them from telling where the treasure was buried. He also marooned Benjamina Gunn on Treasure Island. His first name is revealed to be Burney.
- Frederick Warder as Calico Jerry, one of the human pirates of Long John Silver's crew. He was the first aboard the Hispaniola to come down with the Cabin Fever. Calico Jerry is later defeated by Jim Hawkins.
- Harry Jones as Easy Pete, another member of Silver's Crew. He is defeated easily by Benjamina Gunn.
- Peter Geeves as Black Eyed Pea, a pirate with two black eyes. Another of the human pirates and members of Long John Silver's Crew. He is introduced during the roll call and sings a solo in "Professional Pirate" stating that he could've been a contender (with that line being dubbed by Bill Barretta impersonating Marlon Brando). Black Eyed Pea too is defeated by Benjamina via a swift kick between the legs.
- Danny Blackner as Short Stack Stevens, a dwarf pirate and the smallest human pirate on board the Hispaniola. Like Easy Pete and Black Eyed Pea, he is defeated by Benjamina in the fight sequence with a kiss and a head butt.
- Jessica Hamilton as Big-Fat-Ugly-Bug-Faced-Baby-Eating O'Brien, a beautiful woman pirate with a deep manly voice. Her name does not at all match that of her appearance: the horrible name of the beautiful lady was a comic parallel to the lovely name of the hideous monster Angel Marie who was next on the roll call. The character is shown only once and does not appear again.

=== Muppets performers ===
Performer	Muppet character	Treasure Island character
Dave Goelz	Gonzo	Himself
Dave Goelz	Dr. Bunsen Honeydew	Dr. David Livesey
Dave Goelz	Waldorf	Figurehead
Dave Goelz	Zoot	Crew member
Dave Goelz	Mudwell the Mudbunny	Himself
Steve Whitmire	Kermit the Frog	Captain Abraham Smollett
Steve Whitmire	Rizzo the Rat	Himself
Steve Whitmire	Beaker	Dr. Livesey's assistant
Steve Whitmire	Original	Walleye Pike
Frank Oz	Miss Piggy	Benjamina Gunn
Frank Oz	Fozzie Bear	Squire Trelawney (voice only)
Frank Oz	Sam Eagle	Mr. Samuel Arrow (voice only)
Frank Oz	Animal	Himself (voice only)
Jerry Nelson	Statler	Figurehead
Jerry Nelson	Lew Zealand	Crew member
Jerry Nelson	Floyd Pepper	Crew member
Jerry Nelson	Originals	Blind Pew
Jerry Nelson	Originals	Mad Monty
Jerry Nelson	Originals	Old Joe
Jerry Nelson	Originals	Calico
Jerry Nelson	Originals	Old Tom
Jerry Nelson	Originals	Spotted Dick
Kevin Clash	Fozzie Bear	Squire Trelawney (puppetry only)
Kevin Clash	Miss Piggy	Benjamina Gunn (puppetry only)
Kevin Clash	Sam Eagle	Mr. Samuel Arrow (puppetry only)
Kevin Clash	Animal	Himself (puppetry only)
Kevin Clash	Originals	Bad Polly Lobster
Kevin Clash	Originals	Black Dog
Kevin Clash	Originals	Spa'am
Kevin Clash	Originals	Real Old Tom
Bill Barretta	Mudwell the Mudbunny	Himself (singing only)
Bill Barretta	Jacques Roach	Himself
Bill Barretta	Swedish Chef	Himself
Bill Barretta	Originals	Clueless Morgan
Bill Barretta	Originals	Angel Marie
Bill Barretta	Originals	Mr. Bitte
John Henson	Sweetums	Himself
Louise Gold	Brool the Minstrel	Himself
Louise Gold	Original	Tourist Rat
Don Austen	Originals	Background Pirates, Native Pigs

== Production ==
Following the release of The Muppet Christmas Carol (1992), it was decided that the next Muppet film would be an adaptation of a classic story. Co-writer Kirk R. Thatcher stated: "There were a whole bunch of ideas out there and I was most keen [on] Treasure Island and a King Arthur story with medival [sic] dragons and knights, in the end we all agreed as a group that Treasure Island was a better story for the Muppets to take on." In the first draft, Gonzo and Rizzo were initially written to portray two characters named Jim and Hawkins, but Thatcher explained that "the studio was nervous that they couldn't hold the emotional heart of the movie, so eventually the human Jim Hawkins was written in, and we cast Gonzo and Rizzo alongside him." About a hundred actors auditioned the role of Jim Hawkins, but Kevin Bishop, who did the very first audition, received the part.

In May 1993, Brian Henson announced that the Muppets would appear in a loose film adaptation of Treasure Island. Filming was slated to begin in the fall in London with a tentative release date slated for spring 1994. While the film did not have a distributor at the time, Walt Disney Pictures had a first-look deal. Veteran Muppet performer Frank Oz was unavailable for most of the shooting due to scheduling conflicts with his directing career, so fellow Muppet performer Kevin Clash puppeteered his characters Miss Piggy, Fozzie Bear, Sam Eagle and Animal on set, while Oz dubbed the voices in post-production. According to Clash, Oz had discussions with him about the personalities of his characters, and had also participated in a recorded read-through of the script; Clash used these recordings to help inform his performances of Oz's characters.

== Music ==
Muppet Treasure Island: Original Motion Picture Soundtrack

Soundtrack album by The Muppets
- Released: February 6, 1996
- Recorded: 1995
- Genre: Soundtrack
- Label: Angel

The Muppets chronology
The Muppet Christmas Carol: Original Motion Picture Soundtrack (1992)	Muppet Treasure Island: Original Motion Picture Soundtrack (1996)	Muppets from Space: The Ultimate Muppet Trip (1999)

Singles from The Muppet Treasure Island: Original Motion Picture Soundtrack
- 1. "Love Power" Released: 1996

Professional ratings
Review scores
Source	Rating
Allmusic	4/5 stars

The Muppet Treasure Island: Original Motion Picture Soundtrack scored by Hans Zimmer, as well as songs written by pop songwriters Barry Mann and Cynthia Weil. The film's ending includes the reggae number "Love Power" performed by Ziggy Marley and the Melody Makers, which was released as a single and promoted with a music video featuring Marley and some Muppets with dreadlocks.

=== Musical numbers ===
1. "Shiver My Timbers" – The Pirates
2. "Something Better" – Jim, Gonzo and Rizzo
3. "Sailing for Adventure" – The Hispaniola crew
4. "Cabin Fever" – The Hispaniola crew
5. "A Professional Pirate" – Silver and the Pirates
6. "Boom Shakalaka" – Island Natives: composed by Hans Zimmer
7. "Love Led Us Here" – Smollett and Benjamina
8. "Love Power" (end credits) – Ziggy Marley and the Melody Makers
9. "Love Led Us Here" (end credits) – John Berry and Helen Darling

== Release ==
To coincide with the film's theatrical release, a making-of documentary featuring the filmmakers and the Muppets aired on the Disney Channel on February 2, 1996. On February 14, 1996, Jim Henson Video released a direct-to-video Muppet Sing Alongs VHS entitled Muppet Treasure Island, which was hosted by Kermit the Frog and featured two musical numbers from the film.

=== Home media ===
Muppet Treasure Island was the second Muppet film co-produced and released by Walt Disney Pictures, following The Muppet Christmas Carol. It has been made available on home video formats. Walt Disney Home Video and Jim Henson Video first released the film on VHS on September 10, 1996. During its initial home video release, it had sold an estimated 5 million VHS copies. The film was re-released on a "Special Edition" DVD in Region 1 on August 8, 2000.

The first DVD release in the United States was on June 4, 2002. The DVD release features a full-screen presentation, plus a sing-along feature, a making-of documentary, and a "Hidden Treasure Commentary" with Gonzo, Rizzo and director Brian Henson. A second DVD edition, released November 29, 2005 to celebrate Kermit the Frog's 50th-anniversary celebration, drops these features while adding a widescreen presentation option, and an interview between Pepe the King Prawn and Fozzie. The film made its debut on Blu-ray Disc on December 10, 2013 as part of a two-movie bundle with The Great Muppet Caper.

== Reception ==
=== Box office ===
Muppet Treasure Island opened on February 16, 1996 in 2,070 venues and grossed $7.9 million over the weekend, ranking third at the US box office behind the second weekend of Broken Arrow and fellow newcomer Happy Gilmore. At the time, it held the record for having the biggest opening weekend gross for a Disney film in February. It ultimately grossed $34.3 million in the United States and Canada and $47.2 million worldwide.

=== Critical reception ===
On review aggregator Rotten Tomatoes, the film has an approval rating of 80% based on 88 reviews. The website's critical consensus reads: "Though less Muppet-centric than the original trilogy, Muppet Treasure Island is an energetic, cheerful take on Robert Louis Stevenson's classic adventure, with typically solid gags." On Metacritic, the film has a score of 64 out of 100 based on 18 reviews, indicating "generally favorable reviews". Audiences polled by CinemaScore gave the film an average rating of "A−" on an A+ to F scale.

Stephen Holden of The New York Times praised the playfulness of the Muppets as keeping "the story amusingly off-kilter. The mood is perfectly in keeping with the notion of the Muppets as contemporary children dressing up and improvising their own versions of classic tales." Ken Tucker, reviewing for Entertainment Weekly, gave the film a B+ noting that "the film is notably handsome in a dark, foreboding way. The Muppet action blends seamlessly with the human actors, and adults will be kept giggling with wittily anachronistic jokes about codependence, water-skiing, and Henry Kissinger."

Roger Ebert, reviewing for the Chicago Sun-Times, gave the film two-and-a-half stars out of four. While he was favorable to Tim Curry's performance, he summarized the film as being "less cleverly written, and for moi it's a near miss." Gene Siskel of the Chicago Tribune gave the film two stars out of four writing that the film was a "boring Muppet adventure that doesn't successfully meld the Muppets into a conventional buried-treasure story. I wanted the Muppets to play themselves rather than phony pirate-related characters."

== Video game ==
A video game based on the film was released for Windows and Mac OS in 1996 by Activision.

== Lawsuit ==
The Hormel Foods Corporation (the creators of Spam) sued Jim Henson Productions for using the name "Spa'am" for one of the film's tribal pig characters. The judge dismissed their suit on September 22, 1995 after a trial for failure to prove damages, noting, "one might think Hormel would welcome the association with a genuine source of pork." When Spa'am later appeared as a racing boss in Muppet RaceMania, he was credited as "Pig Chief".
