= Wembley Fraggle =

Muppet character

- Fraggle Rock character
- Created by: Jim Henson
- Voiced by: Bob Bergen (Fraggle Rock: The Animated Series)
- Performed by: Steve Whitmire (Fraggle Rock); Jordan Lockhart (Fraggle Rock: Back to the Rock); Frankie Cordero (Fraggle Rock: Rock On!)

In-universe information
- Species: Fraggle
- Gender: Male

Wembley Fraggle is a fictional puppet character who appears in Jim Henson's television series Fraggle Rock, as well as its reboot Fraggle Rock: Back to the Rock. In the original series, he is performed by Steve Whitmire. In Back to the Rock, he is performed by Jordan Lockhart. Bob Bergen voiced him in the animated series.

In both the original series and its reboot, Wembley is one of the five main characters, and the best friend of the show's protagonist Gobo Fraggle. Wembley is cheerful, indecisive, and insecure. He has a tendency to get overexcited in certain situations. Wembley is always seen wearing a t-shirt with a banana tree motif on it. He works as the siren for the Fraggle Rock Volunteer Fire Department.

== Development ==
Wembley, along with the other Fraggles, was first conceived and developed by series creator Jim Henson. The Wembley puppet was designed by Michael K. Frith and built by Rollie Krewson. Wembley's name was derived from Wembley Stadium in London. In-universe, his first name has the meaning of "one who is indecisive", suiting Wembley well. When building Wembley, Rollie Krewson used a ping-pong ball for the distinctive shape of his nose; the ball has a hole in it where the puppeteer's finger can be inserted to move the mouth. Krewson also rebuilt Wembley for Back to the Rock. During the audition process for Fraggle Rock, fellow Muppeteer Jerry Nelson (later to play Gobo) performed Wembley.

== Behind the scenes ==
Wembley is a rod puppet, meaning that his arms are controlled by rods attached to the puppet's hands. Wembley's puppet has the unique ability among Fraggles to roll his eyes, often used in scenes to show that he is growing nervous or excited. This is achieved by swapping out the regular head of the puppet for one with a radio-controlled mechanism inside.

Steve Whitmire performed Wembley on the original series. Following Whitmire's departure from the Muppets in 2016, John Tartaglia physically performed Wembley for the short-form TV series Fraggle Rock: Rock On! for Apple TV+ in 2020, with Frankie Cordero dubbing the voice. For 2022's Fraggle Rock: Back to the Rock, Jordan Lockhart assumed the role.

== Appearances ==
Wembley appears as one of the five main characters in the original Fraggle Rock series and Fraggle Rock: Back to the Rock, as well as the short series Fraggle Rock: Rock On! He also appears in Fraggle Rock: The Animated Series, voiced there by Bob Bergen. Along with the other Fraggles, he appeared (performed by Steve Whitmire) in the 1987 TV special A Muppet Family Christmas.
