= Rizzo the Rat =

Muppet character

- The Muppets character
- Rizzo in the episode Little Green Lie of The Muppets
- First appearance: The Muppet Show (1980)
- Created by: Steve Whitmire; Jim Henson
- Voiced by: Ben Diskin (Muppet Babies)
- Performed by: Steve Whitmire (1980–2016); Bradley Freeman Jr. (2025-present)

In-universe information
- Species: Muppet rat
- Gender: Male
- Nationality: American

Rizzo the Rat is a Muppet character from the sketch comedy television series The Muppet Show, created and originally performed by Steve Whitmire until 2016.

He is a fictional rat who appeared on The Muppet Show and numerous films, with a starring role in the 1992 film The Muppet Christmas Carol.

The character is particularly associated with Gonzo the Great, with the two sharing a double act since 1992. Whitmire based the character on Ratso Rizzo in Midnight Cowboy.

== Character ==
Rizzo is a streetwise and sarcastic rat with a New Jersey accent. He is a self-proclaimed acrophobe. His humor can be risqué, as in the TV series The Muppets where he was given the line, "Is ABC going to be OK with 'Mother Teresa on a stick'?" To avoid potential difficulty with real-life censors, alternative lines were filmed.

Rizzo's family has been mentioned in Muppet media. He has 1,274 brothers and sisters, as he told to Gonzo in The Muppet Christmas Carol. Disney stated that Rizzo came from a family of pizza makers as part of the backstory of the PizzeRizzo restaurant formerly located at Disney's Hollywood Studios.

== History ==
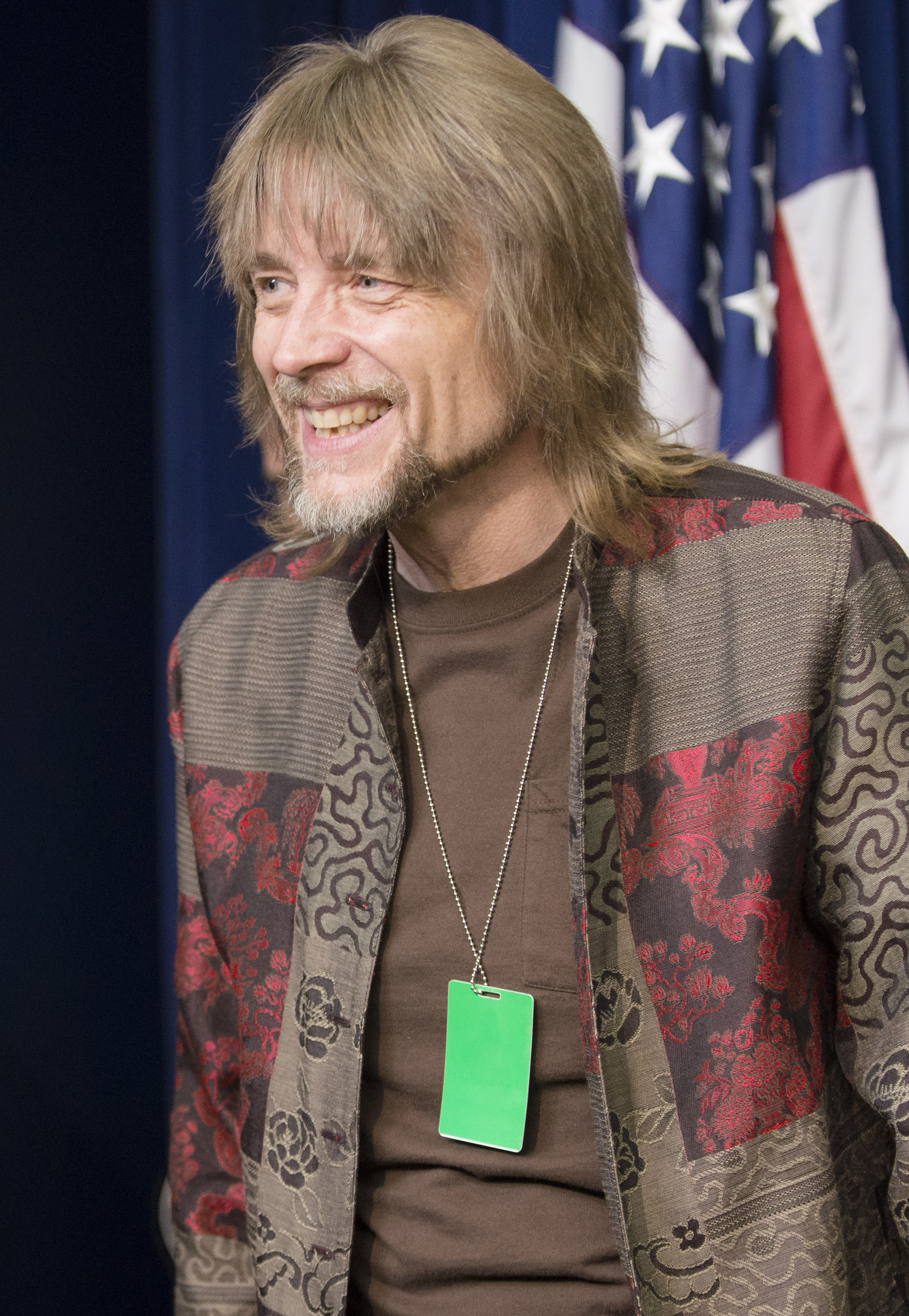
Steve Whitmire created Rizzo and was his original performer.

Rizzo's name is derived from Dustin Hoffman's Ratso Rizzo character in Midnight Cowboy. Steve Whitmire created the character, based on rat puppets that he had previously made out of bottles.

Rizzo first appeared in a 1980 episode of The Muppet Show guest starring Christopher Reeve, as one of many Muppet rats following Reeve backstage. Rizzo can be seen mugging and reacting to practically every line of dialogue. He remained a scene-stealing background figure through the final season, occasionally performing with Dr. Teeth and the Electric Mayhem. By the time of The Muppet Christmas Carol, Whitmire had been performing Rizzo for around 12 years.

After the series, he appeared in the 1981 film The Great Muppet Caper as a bellboy in a fleabag London hotel. He has appeared in most later Muppet projects, including the 1984 film The Muppets Take Manhattan and Muppets Tonight. In The Muppet Christmas Carol, he developed a double act with Gonzo, with director Brian Henson and the crew envisioning Rizzo as "pain-in-the-neck sidekick." The characters narrate, break the fourth wall, and Rizzo challenges Gonzo's claims to be Charles Dickens. The Gonzo and Rizzo partnership was continued in the 1996 film Muppet Treasure Island and the 1999 film Muppets from Space. Along with Kermit the Frog and Gonzo, Rizzo gave an audio commentary for the Muppets from Space DVD.

Rizzo appears as a background character in the 2011 film The Muppets, without a spoken dialogue, although he is seen singing along during the finale, as well as the scene in which Kermit addresses a large crowd of Muppets. In the 2014 film Muppets Most Wanted, and the short feature Rizzo's Biggest Fan on the Blu-ray release, the character calls for more screentime. Rizzo returned to prominence in the TV series The Muppets, where he was on a writing crew with Gonzo and Pepe the King Prawn.

Following Whitmire's dismissal by The Muppets Studio in 2016, Rizzo did not have any speaking roles until 2025 when Bradley Freeman Jr. was announced to have taken over the role.

Benjamin Diskin voiced baby Rizzo in the animated series Muppet Babies (2018–2022).

== Appearances ==
- The Muppet Show (1980–1981) (TV)
- The Muppets Go to the Movies (1981)
- The Great Muppet Caper (1981)
- The Fantastic Miss Piggy Show (1982)
- Rocky Mountain Holiday (1983)
- The Muppets Take Manhattan (1984)
- The Muppets: A Celebration of 30 Years (1986, background character)
- A Muppet Family Christmas (1987)
- The Jim Henson Hour (1989, background character)
- The Muppets at Walt Disney World (1990)
- The Muppets Celebrate Jim Henson (1990)
- Muppet*Vision 3D (1991, pre-show only)
- The Muppet Christmas Carol (1992) – Appearance as himself
- Muppet Classic Theater (1994)
- Muppet Treasure Island (1996) – Appearance as himself
- Muppets Tonight (1996–1998) (TV)
- Muppets from Space (1999)
- Disneyland (2001)
- It's a Very Merry Muppet Christmas Movie (2002) (TV)
- The Muppets' Wizard of Oz (2005) (TV) – Appearance as himself and the Mayor of Munchkinland
- Studio DC: Almost Live (2008) (TV)
- A Muppets Christmas: Letters to Santa (2008) (TV)
- The Muppets (2011, background character)
- Lady Gaga and the Muppets Holiday Spectacular (2013) (TV)
- Muppets Most Wanted (2014)
- The Muppets (2015–2016) (TV)
- Muppet Babies (2018–2022) (TV)
- Muppets Haunted Mansion (2021, silent cameo) (Streaming)
- The Muppet Show (2026) (TV and streaming)
