= Muppets Tonight =

1990s sequel to the Muppet Show

- Genre: Comedy
- Created by: Jim Henson Productions
- Based on: The Muppets by Jim Henson
- Directed by: Greg V. Fera; Brian Henson; Tom Trbovich; Gary Halvorson
- Starring: Dave Goelz; Brian Henson; Jerry Nelson; Steve Whitmire; Kevin Clash; Bill Barretta; Frank Oz; Leslie Carrara-Rudolph
- Composer: Richard Gibbs
- Country of origin: United States
- Original language: English
- No. of seasons: 2
- No. of episodes: 22

Production
- Production locations: Raleigh Studios; Hollywood, California
- Running time: 22–24 minutes
- Production company: Jim Henson Productions

Original release
- Network: ABC
- Release: March 8 – July 14, 1996
- Network: Disney Channel
- Release: September 13, 1997 – February 8, 1998

Muppets Tonight is an American live-action/puppet family-oriented comedy television series, created by Jim Henson Productions and featuring the Muppets. The series ran for two seasons between March 8, 1996 to February 8, 1998, originally airing on ABC before later being aired and rerun on the Disney Channel. The show was a continuation of The Muppet Show as the sixth and seventh seasons overall, with Kermit the Frog and the Muppets running their own television channel and studio.

The series brought back several Muppet characters from The Muppet Show while introducing several new ones to the program, and made parodies of television programs ranging from game shows, talk shows, and educational entertainment. Each episode featured one principal guest star, but a number of episodes also featured additional guest stars; one episode featured a cameo from Leonard Nimoy. Muppets Tonight received mixed reviews from critics.

== Format ==
The premise of Muppets Tonight was that Clifford was the host of a variety/talk show on KMUP. The show stuck closely to The Muppet Show format of various skits (mostly featuring the show's human guest star) interspersed with some sort of crisis occurring backstage.

== Characters ==
Clifford as he appears on Muppets Tonight.

=== Returning Muppets ===
The characters performed by Frank Oz appeared intermittently on Muppets Tonight due to scheduling conflicts with his directing career.

- Clifford (performed by Kevin Clash) – Host of the show. Although he had visible eyes in this series instead of his previous sunglasses, he went back to wearing sunglasses for all of his appearances after Muppets Tonight ended. At the MuppetFest convention in 2001, Clash revealed that he preferred Clifford wearing sunglasses, refusing to perform the character again unless he was wearing them.
- Kermit the Frog (performed by Steve Whitmire) – Producer of the show
- Animal (performed by Frank Oz)
- Zoot (performed by Dave Goelz)
- Beauregard (performed by Dave Goelz) – Janitor of KMUP
- Bean Bunny (performed by Steve Whitmire)
- Behemoth (performed by Bill Barretta) – Ernst Stavros Grouper's assistant
- Dr. Bunsen Honeydew (performed by Dave Goelz) – The scientist and inventor from Muppet Labs who shows off his inventions on the show
- Beaker (performed by Steve Whitmire) – Dr. Bunsen Honeydew's assistant
- Dr. Julius Strangepork (performed by Jerry Nelson) – Appears in a "Bay of Pigswatch" sketch as the lifeguard inspector as seen in the Pierce Brosnan episode
- Clueless Morgan (performed by Bill Barretta) – A goat who previously appeared in the 1996 film Muppet Treasure Island; appears in the "At the Bar" sketch co-owning a bar with Polly Lobster, who also previously appeared in Muppet Treasure Island
- The Elvises (performed by Brian Henson, Jerry Nelson, and Bill Barretta) – A group of Muppets resembling Elvis Presley that star in "Great Moments in Elvis History"
- Eugene (performed by Steve Whitmire) – A mink who serves as Nigel's assistant
- George the Janitor (performed by Steve Whitmire) – Janitor of KMUP
- Gonzo (performed by Dave Goelz) – Does his stunt shows on the show
- Fozzie Bear (performed by Frank Oz)
- J.P. Grosse (performed by Kevin Clash) – The owner of the Muppet Theater who makes cameos as a crew member. In the Sandra Bullock episode, he appears in "The Tubmans of Porksmith" as Howard Tubman's doctor (performed by Allan Trautman)
- Miss Piggy (performed by Frank Oz)
- Mulch (performed by Kevin Clash) – Dr. Phil van Neuter's assistant (shown in minor parts in earlier Muppet projects); in one sketch, it is revealed that he has a sister named Composta Heap to whom Dr. Phil van Neuter is engaged
- Polly Lobster (performed by Kevin Clash) – A lobster who previously appeared in Muppet Treasure Island; appears in the "At the Bar" sketch co-owning a bar with Clueless Morgan
- Rizzo the Rat (performed by Steve Whitmire) – Production assistant of the show
- Rowlf the Dog (performed by Bill Barretta) – Makes one appearance playing pianos in some acts
- Sam Eagle (performed by Frank Oz) – Hosts "The Eagle's Nest"
- Andy and Randy Pig (performed by Steve Whitmire and Dave Goelz) – Miss Piggy's moronic nephews who work backstage (usually causing problems) and appear in the sketch "Bay Of Pigswatch"
- Statler and Waldorf (performed by Jerry Nelson and Dave Goelz) – Usually seen heckling the show from an unnamed retirement home (season 2 has them traveling to different areas while watching the show)
- Sweetums (performed by John Henson)

=== New Muppets ===
Some of the Muppets introduced on Muppets Tonight went on to appear in later Muppet productions, particularly Pepe the King Prawn, who has become a regular.

- A. Ligator (performed by Jerry Nelson) – A pink vulture who serves as the show's announcer
- Barbershop Cactus Quartet – A group of four cacti who make up their own barbershop quartet
- Big Mean Carl (performed by Bill Barretta) – A green shaggy monster. He often uses disguises or variety acts to disguise his intentions of eating other Muppets or objects, and eats the prized pet whenever a contestant loses (or wins) Swift Wits. He also makes some audience appearances
- Bill the Bubble Guy (performed by Dave Goelz) – A blue-skinned Muppet who can make bubbles come out of his head; first appears in the Garth Brooks episode where the Head of the Network threatened to replace Clifford with Bill if Brooks did not sing one of his country songs.
- Bobo the Bear (performed by Bill Barretta) – A bear who works as a security guard
- Captain Pighead (performed by Steve Whitmire) – A pig who serves as the captain of the new Swinetrek in the "Pigs in Space: Deep Dish Nine" segments
- Craniac (performed by Kevin Clash) – An alien with a brain for a head; a crew member on the Swinetrek in the "Pigs in Space: Deep Dish Nine" segments
- Cue Card Monster (performed by Bill Barretta) – A small green monster with long arms who works as the cue card holder
- Darci (performed by Leslie Carrara-Rudolph) – She was featured in "The Real World Muppets" segments
- David Hoggselhoff (a parody of David Hasselhoff; performed by Bill Barretta) – A pig who is the star of "Bay of Pigswatch"
- Dr. Pain (performed by Dave Goelz) – A doctor who appears on "E-I-E-I-O R"
- Dr. Phil van Neuter (performed by Brian Henson) – A mad scientist who hosts "Tales from the Vet"
- Ernst Stavros Grouper (a parody of Ernst Stavro Blofeld; performed by Bill Barretta) – An eyepatch-wearing grouper who is the chairman and CEO of The Grouper Group which bought out Carni-Vore Industries (the company that owns KMUP) in the episode that guest stars Don Rickles and Coolio
- Floor Manager (performed by Leslie Carrara-Rudolph) – The unnamed floor manager of K-MUP
- Gary Cahuenga (performed by Dave Goelz) – A ventriloquist's dummy with a mind of his own
- Head of the Network (performed by Jerry Nelson) – Clifford's unnamed boss at K-MUP who first appears in the "Garth Brooks" episode wanting Clifford to get Garth Brooks to perform a country song or he will give Clifford's time slot to Bill the Bubble Guy; makes background appearances in the control room in later episodes
- Howard Tubman (performed by Bill Barretta) – A rich food-loving pig who is featured in "The Tubmans of Porksmith"
  - Carter (performed by Kevin Clash) – Howard Tubman's elderly doddering butler
- Johnny Fiama (performed by Bill Barretta) – A Rat Pack-style singer
- Jowls (performed by Jerry Nelson) – A wrinkly faced man who leads a house band called the Muppets Tonight Band
- Larry – A crew member at K-MUP
- Mr. Poodlepants (performed by Steve Whitmire) – An eccentric character with a strange fashion style
- Muppets Tonight Writers – A group of three monkeys who did the writing for the show as seen in the "Andie MacDowell" episode
- Nigel (performed by Brian Henson) – A green monster with a long pointy nose who serves as the show's stressed-out director
- Pepe the King Prawn (performed by Bill Barretta) – A king prawn who serves as the elevator operator and commissary cook; often paired up with Seymour; speaks with a heavy Spanish accent
- Pokey – A monster who appears in unnamed appearances in this show
- Sal Minella (performed by Brian Henson) – A chimpanzee who serves as Johnny Fiama's flunky, bodyguard, and assistant
- Seymour (performed by Brian Henson) – An elephant who serves as the elevator operator and commissary cook; often paired with Pepe
- Snookie Blyer (performed by Bill Barretta) – The host of the game show "Swift Wits"
- Snorty (a parody of Lieutenant Commander Montgomery "Scotty" Scott; performed by Dave Goelz) – A pig who appears in the "Pigs in Space: Deep Dish Nine" segments
- Spamela Hamderson (performed by Leslie Carrara-Rudolph) – A pig who is a spoof of Pamela Anderson. She stars in "Bay Of Pigswatch" and appears whenever a femme fatale is needed
- Thor (performed by Brian Henson) – The God of Thunder who is seen doing everyday mundane tasks; whenever someone angered him, Thor would strike the person with lightning
- Zippity Zap (performed by Bill Barretta) – A frog who is one of the crew members on the show
- Female Rock Lobster (episode 14) – (performed by John Kennedy)
- Fairyland Police Chief (episodes 8, 9, 13, and 17) – performed by Allan Trautman)

== Recurring sketches ==
Among the regular sketches are:

- Bay of Pigswatch – A parody of Baywatch starring David Hoggselhoff as Champ Schwimmer, Spamela Hamderson as Spamela, and Andy and Randy Pig as Donnie and Art C. Shell where they work as lifeguards at a beach. with Guest Stars Miss Piggy and Dr. Julius Strangepork.
- Carl the Big Mean... – Sketches which involve Carl doing an act, which usually ends up incorporating him eating someone or something, e.g., biting the head off a ventriloquist's puppet, predicting someone would be eaten, and eating him, as a psychic.
- E-I-E-I-O R – In a parody of ER, it features Fozzie Bear working at a hospital where the doctors and patients pass around humor; Fozzie is assisted by Dr. Pain, Ernst Stavro Grouper, and an Afghan Hound.
- Great Moments in Elvis History – In a parody of Great Moments in History, the moments in history are reenacted by a bunch of Muppet versions of Elvis Presley.
- Pigs In Space: Deep Dish Nine – In a sequel to "Pigs in Space", Miss Piggy is featured on the new Swinetrek with a different crew. The title is a spoof of Star Trek: Deep Space Nine.
- Screen Tests – A bunch of screen tests that featured the Muppets auditioning in a movie that featured the guest stars of the episodes it was featured in.
- Tales from the Vet – In a parody of Tales from the Crypt, Dr. Phil van Neuter tells scary stories revolving around animals.
- The Eagle's Nest – Sam the Eagle talks about politics and other issues with Andy and Randy Pig as his recurring guests.
- The Johnny Fiama Show – A talk show hosted by Johnny Fiama.
- NYPD Green - A parody of NYPD Blue, where crimes are investigated by Kermit as Detective Amphibowicz, at least when the network censor's not interrupting.
- The Real World Muppets – A spoof of The Real World that follows Clifford, Rizzo the Rat, Bobo the Bear, Bill the Bubble Guy, and Darci living together in one house.
- Thor: God of Thunder – Deals with Thor doing every day mundane tasks.
- UK Spots – There were some UK Spots that were in this show due to the United Kingdom version not having any commercials.
  - Fairyland PD – Clifford and Bobo the Bear work as detectives at the Fairyland Police Department under the supervision of their police chief; Clifford and Bobo are charged with the duties of solving mysteries revolving around nursery rhymes and fairy tales.
  - Mr. Callahan – Features the unseen Mr. Callahan who is a regular customer at a bar owned by Polly Lobster and Clueless Morgan with this sketch being at Mr. Callahan's point of view.
  - Swift Wits – A game show that stars Snookie Blyer. In it, one must guess a secret word in 10 seconds to stop Carl (in his Carl the Big Mean Bunny alter ego) from eating an adorable animal. In 5 of the 6 cases, the contestant failed spectacularly, and, on the occasion the contestant got the word correct - without clues - Carl defied Snookie to eat both the pet and then the contestant.
  - The Tubmans of Porksmith – Follows the comical misadventures of a rich food-loving pig named Howard Tubman and his butler Carter (it was reworked into Boarshead Revisited in season 2).

== Series run ==
The show ran from 1996 to 1998. There were 22 episodes produced in two batches. 13 episodes were ordered by ABC, though only ten of them were run in the 1995–96 TV season. The program was then purchased by the Disney Channel, which led a further 8 episodes and aired these along with the three episodes ABC did not air, in the 1997–98 season. One of the nine newly produced episodes was a clip show compilation culled from the earlier episodes.

In the United Kingdom only the first thirteen episodes of the show were transmitted. BBC1 screened the first 11 episodes at 7pm on Friday evenings from 6 September – 15 November 1996 with the last two going on 30th and 31st December at Lunchtimes. Sky One picked up the series in late December 1996 and continued to repeat episodes until Spring 1999. The BBC repeated 10 episodes in late August 1999.

In Ireland the show was broadcast on TG4, eventually being dubbed into Irish Gaelic.

In Canada, the show originally aired on CBC, and later moved to Family Channel in conjunction with Disney Channel's airings.

== Home media ==
In 2005, Brian Henson expressed interest in releasing the show on DVD. However, as of 2026, Muppets Tonight has never been released on home media or made available on any streaming or digital platforms.

== Episodes ==
Season	Episodes	Originally released	
Season	Episodes	First released	Last released
1	10	March 8, 1996	July 14, 1996
2	12	September 13, 1997	February 8, 1998

=== Season 1 (1996) ===
No. overall	No. in season	Guest(s)	Directed by	Written by	Original release date	Prod. code	Viewers (millions)
1	1	Michelle Pfeiffer	Gary Halvorson	Dick Blasucci, Paul Flaherty, Darin Henry, Jim Lewis, Kirk Thatcher & Patric Verrone	March 8, 1996 (ABC); October 5, 1997 (Disney Channel)	101	17.2
The show opens with Kermit welcoming the Muppets to their new TV studio. Gonzo The Great is reading out their new TV schedule, when they discover that there is nothing scheduled for that night. Kermit says that they have to put together a show, but no-one wants to host it. Clifford, who is on the phone in a corner of the room and has missed all the commotion, is chosen to host the show. Owing to the short notice, the organizing is very haphazard. They have no acts booked and have to find them at the last minute. They have to make do with a troupe of dancing cheeses, which doesn't suit Clifford. He wants a big name guest star. Miss Piggy agrees to be the guest star, in exchange for Clifford giving her bumbling nephews, Andy and Randy, a job on the show. Kermit, meanwhile, has roped in Michelle Pfeiffer to be the guest star. Clifford seems to forget about Miss Piggy, only remembering when Rizzo tells him that they now have two guest stars. They spend the rest of the show trying to keep Miss Piggy and Michelle apart. It doesn't work, and the two rivals end up singing the closing number- excerpts from The Sound of Music" - together. Sketches include "Muppet Match-Up", a blind date show, supposedly from 1975, with Michelle Pfeiffer as the bachelorette, who ends up dating Bachelor No.3 (Animal) - he leaves her no option. The show also includes "Great Moments In Elvis History"- three Muppet caricatures of Elvis Presley re-enact the signing of the Declaration of Independence, which is interrupted by Benjamin Franklin, who has just discovered electricity. The Elvises take out their electric guitars, and end the sketch with a parody of "Blue Suede Shoes". Miss Piggy also stars in the recurring Baywatch parody sketch, "Bay of Pigswatch", doing her trademark karate chop on flirtatious lifeguard Champ Schwimmer, when he admits he'd rather make out with beach babe Spamela than carry out his life-saving duties. Note: Polly Lobster and Clueless Morgan from Muppet Treasure Island make their first appearance in At the Bar sketch.
2	2	Garth Brooks	Greg V. Fera	Dick Blasucci, Paul Flaherty, Darin Henry, Jim Lewis, Kirk Thatcher & Patric Verrone	March 15, 1996 (ABC); September 28, 1997 (Disney Channel)	104	15.3
Everyone expects Garth Brooks to sing one of his hit country songs for the show, but he insists in pursuing different styles of music such as Kabuki, the theme song from Fiddler on the Roof and a Tom Jones number. Note: This is the first appearances of Pepe the King Prawn and Bobo the Bear
3	3	Billy Crystal	Gary Halvorson	Dick Blasucci, Paul Flaherty, Darin Henry, Jim Lewis, Kirk Thatcher & Patric Verrone	March 22, 1996 (ABC); January 11, 1998 (Disney Channel)	105	13.9
Billy Crystal features in parodies of When Harry Met Sally... and City Slickers. We are also introduced to the security guard, Bobo The Bear, who will not let anyone into the studio who is not on his list. He stops Larry King from entering the studio, only to discover that his name is on the list when it's too late. We also see the first episode of "The Eagle's Nest", a political commentary show hosted by Sam Eagle. The first topic is taxes. It doesn't go according to plan, because Sam's guests are Andy and Randy Pig, who fail to understand a word he says. The first episode of "The Tubmans of Porksmouth", a show which follows an obese pig's futile attempts to lose weight and was only shown in Britain, also aired on this show. Howard Tubman, the main character, tries to lose 200lb in order to claim a fortune left by his deceased Aunt Polly. He fails miserably, but it turns out she wasn't dead after all. A group of jungle animals sing "The Lion Sleeps Tonight", but are interrupted when the lion in question chases them off the set for disturbing his rest. The closing number is a jazz number performed by Billy Crystal and the entire Muppets Tonight cast, when Billy's all-star band doesn't turn up. We learn that this is because Bobo won't let them in, even though they include President Bill Clinton, President Boris Yeltzin, President Ronald Reagan, Clint Eastwood, and even Queen Elizabeth II.
4	4	John Goodman	Greg V. Fera	Dick Blasucci, Paul Flaherty, Darin Henry, Jim Lewis, Kirk Thatcher & Patric Verrone	March 29, 1996 (ABC); November 9, 1997 (Disney Channel)	106	12.1
John Goodman wants a relaxing show, but any hope of that goes out of the window when Andy and Randy Pig assign themselves to be his personal slaves, after he saves them from being electrocuted. The first episode of "Tales From The Vet", sees Dr. Phil Van Neuter, explaining in song (Thomas Dolby's "She Blinded Me With Science"), how he met his wife, Composta Heap, sister of his assistant, Mulch. Clifford rolls a clip of John Goodman in a Muppet sitcom, supposedly made to commemorate the first landing on the Moon, called "The Lunar-Mooners", with Miss Piggy as his wife and Fozzie Bear as his next-door neighbor. Johnny Fiama, a rat-pack singer, attempts to wine and dine a member of the audience, but his assistant picks a woman who doesn't like his music, and, consequently, it ends in disaster. Later, Andy and Randy Pig give John Goodman a scalp massage using glue, and he finally ends up in a truckload of mousetraps and in hospital. He still does the closing number, however- Joe Cocker's "Feelin' All Right". Unfortunately, when he goes back to the set of Roseanne, he discovers to his horror that Andy and Randy now work on Roseanne.
5	5	Cindy Crawford	Greg V. Fera	Dick Blasucci, Paul Flaherty, Darin Henry, Jim Lewis, Kirk Thatcher & Patric Verrone	April 5, 1996 (ABC); January 18, 1998 (Disney Channel)	107	14.2
Glamorous supermodel Cindy Crawford steals Bobo's heart. Rizzo tries unsuccessfully to help him win her. The show also includes a clip from "The Kermit The Frog Club", with a young Cindy as one of the Frogketeers, and an episode of Swift Wits, the fastest game show on TV, in which the two over-enthusiastic contestants refuse to listen to the host's clues to help them identify the mystery object and consequently lose the game. Winky, a happy little Beaver, loses his life, as he is devoured by Carl, the Big Mean Bunny. Finally, Bobo interrupts Kermit and Cindy's closing number, "I Remember It Well" from the musical Gigi, and finally wins Cindy's heart, and they finish the show in grand style, dancing the tango.
6	6	Tony Bennett	Gary Halvorson	Dick Blasucci, Paul Flaherty, Darin Henry, Jim Lewis, Kirk Thatcher & Patric Verrone	April 12, 1996 (ABC); February 1, 1998 (Disney Channel)	109	10.4
Guest star Tony Bennett appears on Johnny Fiama's talk show. Tony wants to sing a duet with Johnny, who has idolized him for years, but Johnny is overcome with nerves and faints. Johnny is in a terrible mood afterwards and cruelly sends his assistant, Sal the Monkey, packing. Sal and Tony discuss how they can make Johnny feel better, and Sal dreams up an idea. Johnny has constructed his own Tony Bennett robot. Unbeknown to Johnny, Sal and Tony remove the robot from its case and Tony stands in its place. Johnny turns the robot on to sing with it instead and finds himself fulfilling his lifelong dream: a duet with the real Tony Bennett. They end the show with "Shakin' the Blues Away".
7	7	Sandra Bullock	Gary Halvorson	Dick Blasucci, Paul Flaherty, Darin Henry, Jim Lewis, Kirk Thatcher & Patric Verrone	June 23, 1996 (ABC); January 25, 1998 (Disney Channel)	108	5.8
Guest star Sandra Bullock. A mad bomber man threatens to bomb the theater unless the Muppets Tonight's rating is 50 or higher. So Andy, Randy, Rizzo, Clifford, and Sandra try to keep the rating up and track the bomber down. They barely manage to keep the ratings up. After the demise of two of their most popular acts, Clifford and Rizzo resort to a series of lower profile acts- Frankie the Yak is pulled from the stage thirty seconds into his polka number, and Johnny Fiama's rendition of "Mack The Knife" is interrupted when a shark charges onto the set and chases him off the stage. Seymour the Elephant and Pepe the Prawn attempt to salvage the situation with a vaudeville comedy number, but no-one in the audience gets the joke. They attempt to explain it using visual aids, but are unsuccessful, and they resort to singing the song again- they are dragged off the stage halfway through. Andy and Randy capture the mad bomber, who turns out to be Sandra herself, who was nervous about the show. She ends up playing a one man band after the show. This episode was originally set to air on ABC on April 19, 1996, but executives pulled the episode from TGIF's lineup at the last minute so as not to coincide with the 1st anniversary of the Oklahoma City bombing. The episode would have aired that day had it not been about someone making a bomb threat. The episode was re-aired in its entirety two months later.
8	8	Jason Alexander	Greg V. Fera	Dick Blasucci, Paul Flaherty, Darin Henry, Jim Lewis, Kirk Thatcher & Patric Verrone	June 30, 1996 (ABC); November 30, 1997 (Disney Channel)	112	4.8
Gonzo is very excited that his old school chum, Jason Alexander, is starring on the Muppet Show. They agree to perform a medley from their hit musical, "Bats", but things don't go according to plan during the warm-up, and they end up falling out. Jason refuses to work with Gonzo ever again, but Clifford, after a LOT of effort, finally manages to persuade him to reconsider- although even then, he only agrees in order to get "this stupid elephant" (Seymour) off his back! The show also featured a parody of "Agatha Christie's Poirot", with Jason in the title role, and the Muppets mistaking him for Hercules, the Ancient Greek hero, causing him to lose patience and storm out of the carriage, falling off the train in the process. We also see an episode of "Thor: God of Thunder". Thor tries to borrow some books from a library, but fails because he does not have a library card (or, for that matter, any form of I.D.). The scene ends with an inexplicable lightning fight between Thor and the Greek god Zeus, much to the despair of the long-suffering librarian.
9	9	Whoopi Goldberg	Gary Halvorson	Dick Blasucci, Paul Flaherty, Darin Henry, Jim Lewis, Kirk Thatcher & Patric Verrone	July 7, 1996 (ABC); November 23, 1997 (Disney Channel)	110	5.4
Whoopi Goldberg is such a big hit with the audience that when Miss Piggy gets lost in the desert, it is decided that Whoopi will perform the closing number instead of her. On hearing this, Miss Piggy redoubles her efforts to return to the studio, and she finally storms in midway through "Diamonds Are a Girl's Best Friend". They finish the song together. We also see a courtroom sketch involving Whoopi Goldberg as the Plaintiff and Miss Piggy as the Defendant- Miss Piggy loses the case and is dragged off stage. Whoopi teaches a group of rats how to sing reggae, and they sing "No Woman No Cry". At the end of the show we find miss Piggy in a plane re-enacting a scene from Nightmare at 20,000 Feet where a gremlin has appeared on the airplane's wing. William Shatner is seen sitting next to her promoting one of his books as he mentions that he's been complaining about the gremlin for years and nobody is doing anything about it..
10	10	Martin Short	Gary Halvorson	Dick Blasucci, Paul Flaherty, Darin Henry, Jim Lewis, Kirk Thatcher & Patric Verrone	July 14, 1996 (ABC); October 26, 1997 (Disney Channel)	102	5.4
Martin Short gets the short end of the shtick when Seymour and Pepe take him on an elevator ride that nearly flattens his chances of performing in the big dance number.

=== Season 2 (1997–98) ===
No. overall	No. in season	Guest(s)	Directed by	Written by	Original release date	Prod. code
11	1	The Artist Formerly Known As Prince	Brian Henson	Jennifer Barrow, Dick Blasucci, Paul Flaherty, Darin Henry, Jim Lewis, Bernie Keating, Kirk Thatcher & Patric Verrone	September 13, 1997	206
The Artist Formerly Known As Prince comes to guest star and gives some song suggestions.
12	2	Rick Moranis	Brian Henson	Jennifer Barrow, Dick Blasucci, Paul Flaherty, Darin Henry, Jim Lewis, Bernie Keating, Kirk Thatcher & Patric Verrone	September 14, 1997	207
Rick Moranis is doing a medley on the show, but gets interrupted when he helps Seymour and Pepe with a cooking show.
13	3	Heather Locklear	Gary Halvorson	Dick Blasucci, Paul Flaherty, Darin Henry, Jim Lewis, Kirk Thatcher & Patric Verrone	November 15, 1996 (UK); September 21, 1997 (US)	111
Heather Locklear assures the Muppets she is perfectly normal. But when she eats some experimental food from Bunsen and Beaker, things go crazy. Note: This episode was broadcast early as such in the UK on BBC Television.
14	4	Pierce Brosnan	Gary Halvorson	Dick Blasucci, Paul Flaherty, Darin Henry, Jim Lewis, Dan McGrath, Kirk Thatcher & Patric Verrone	October 18, 1996 (UK); October 12, 1997 (US)	113
Pierce Brosnan doesn't seem to be a smooth as his character James Bond. He's going to leave the show, until the Rock Lobsters come to take over the show. Note: This episode was broadcast early as such in the UK on BBC Television.
15	5	Coolio & Don Rickles	Gary Halvorson	Jennifer Barrow, Dick Blasucci, Paul Flaherty, Darin Henry, Jim Lewis, Bernie Keating, Kirk Thatcher & Patric Verrone	October 19, 1997	202
An un-cultured CEO buys Muppets Tonight, and makes too many changes, causing Kermit to quit.
16	6	Paula Abdul	Gary Halvorson	Dick Blasucci, Paul Flaherty, Darin Henry, Jim Lewis, Kirk Thatcher & Patric Verrone	December 31, 1996 (UK); November 2, 1997 (US)	103
Paula Abdul guest stars. However, an Abraham Lincoln robot is out of control. Meanwhile, Clifford will do anything to get a kiss from Paula. Notes: Polly Lobster and Clueless Morgan from Muppet Treasure Island made their last appearance in At the Bar sketch. This episode was broadcast early as such in the UK on BBC Television.
17	7	Dennis Quaid	Tom Trbovich	Jennifer Barrow, Dick Blasucci, Paul Flaherty, Darin Henry, Jim Lewis, Bernie Keating, Kirk Thatcher & Patric Verrone	November 16, 1997	203
Clifford feels unappreciated when Dennis Quaid comes along and makes everyone else happy. Meanwhile, Kermit goes on a date with the winner of a sweepstakes. The good news: it's not Miss Piggy. The bad news: it's a very annoying Gilbert Gottfried.
18	8	The Cameo Show	Greg V. Fera	Jennifer Barrow, Dick Blasucci, Paul Flaherty, Darin Henry, Jim Lewis, Bernie Keating, Kirk Thatcher & Patric Verrone	December 7, 1997	201
When Bobo "kills" Arsenio Hall (who was to be their guest star) it's up to the Muppets to find a new guest star.
19	9	The Best of Muppets Tonight	Tom Trbovich	Jennifer Barrow, Dick Blasucci, Paul Flaherty, Darin Henry, Jim Lewis, Bernie Keating, Kirk Thatcher & Patric Verrone	December 21, 1997	209
Gonzo and Rizzo host this week's show giving some of the best segments from the show. Note: This is the last episode to be taped in production order. Series finale.
20	10	Penn & Teller; The Gary Cahuenga Show	Tom Trbovich	Jennifer Barrow, Dick Blasucci, Paul Flaherty, Darin Henry, Jim Lewis, Bernie Keating, Kirk Thatcher & Patric Verrone	December 28, 1997	205
Clifford and Rizzo find a ventriloquist dummy in the studio basement named Gary Cahuenga. But his ventriloquist is long dead and Gary must find out what to do in this strange new world.
21	11	Andie MacDowell	Greg V. Fera	Jennifer Barrow, Dick Blasucci, Paul Flaherty, Darin Henry, Jim Lewis, Bernie Keating, Kirk Thatcher & Patric Verrone	January 4, 1998	204
After Beaker goes on vacation, Bunsen feels like he needs to change his image and seeks the help of Johnny Fiama. And meanwhile, on his Star Trek vacation, Beaker meets George Takei who talks to him for hours.
22	12	Johnny Fiama Leaves Home	Tom Trbovich	Jennifer Barrow, Dick Blasucci, Paul Flaherty, Darin Henry, Jim Lewis, Bernie Keating, Kirk Thatcher & Patric Verrone	February 8, 1998	208
After Johnny's mother throws Daryl Hannah, Page Hannah, and Sal out of his house, Johnny moves out.

== Reception ==
The reception from critics was mixed.
