= Pepe the King Prawn =

Muppet character

- The Muppets character
- First appearance: Muppets Tonight (1996)
- Created by: Michael K. Frith (designer); Eric Engelhardt (builder)
- Performed by: Bill Barretta

In-universe information
- Alias: Pepino Rodrigo Serrano Gonzales
- Species: Muppet king prawn
- Gender: Male
- Occupation: Elevator operator, commissary cook
- Nationality: Spanish

Pepe the King Prawn is a Muppet character from Muppets Tonight and performed by Bill Barretta, originally as part of a vaudeville double act with Seymour the Elephant.

== Overview ==
Pepe is Spanish and speaks with a heavy accent, often punctuating his sentences with "okay?" His character plays on many Hispanic stereotypes: he has a fiery temper (especially when referred to as a "shrimp"), and thinks of himself as a lothario, often making suggestive remarks. He is shown with four arms and is orange with messy orange hair. He is often shown wearing a jacket.

Pepe is also a schemer, willing to betray or at least take advantage of his friends: he allied with Ms. Bitterman in It's a Very Merry Muppet Christmas Movie and worked with Rizzo to trick Gonzo into building a Jacuzzi in Muppets from Space. However, his conscience usually wins out and makes him do what is right in the end.

== Role ==
Pepe has become one of the most popular Muppet characters, providing comedic relief in major supporting roles similar to Rizzo the Rat and appearing in most major Muppet productions since his introduction. He and Bobo the Bear are the only Muppet characters originally created for Muppets Tonight that are still prominently featured in The Muppets franchise. Pepe is frequently cast in the main ensemble, while Bobo is a supporting player.

== Appearances ==
Pepe appeared in fourteen episodes of Muppets Tonight, proved a hit with audiences and has returned many times since. (Although his partner Seymour has never been seen again.) He has major roles in Muppets from Space (1999), It's a Very Merry Muppet Christmas Movie (2002), The Muppets' Wizard of Oz (2005) (where he co-stars as Toto), and A Muppets Christmas: Letters to Santa (2008). He also appears in 2011's The Muppets, though in keeping with that film's focus on the original Muppet Show cast, he has only a brief cameo role as Miss Piggy's dance partner. He appears in the 2014 film Muppets Most Wanted. Though he has more screen time than in The Muppets, his dialogue is limited. His most prominent scene in the film features him gambling on the tour train with hip-hop mogul Sean Combs. He is a regular on The Muppets as a comedy writer for the show-within-a-show, Up Late with Miss Piggy with Gonzo and Rizzo the Rat. In Muppets Now he stars in "Pepe’s Unbelievable Gameshow", a segment in which he hosts a game show and makes up the rules as he goes along, to the annoyance of his co-host, Scooter.

As well as frequent appearances in commercials, Muppet short films and videogames, Pepe was also as an occasional correspondent on Statler and Waldorf: From the Balcony, and hosts "Pepe's Profiles" featurettes produced by Walt Disney Studios Home Entertainment for the Kermit's 50th Anniversary DVD re-releases of early Muppet movies. In 2002, he was the "spokesprawn" for restaurant chain Long John Silver's. He has also made many television appearances on shows including America's Funniest Home Videos, The Jay Leno Show, Late Night with Jimmy Fallon, and Dancing with the Stars. He was also an award presenter at The Game Awards 2018 ceremony, which honored the best video games of that year.

The parody self-help book It's Hard Out Here for a Shrimp is attributed to Pepe and tells his life story.

== Performers ==
Bill Barretta has remained Pepe's performer since his 1996 debut on Muppets Tonight; however, Drew Massey performed Pepe in a test pilot for the web series Statler and Waldorf: From the Balcony.

== Meme ==
Pepe became an internet sensation in December 2024, mainly due to influencers on TikTok using his image to depict feelings of embarrassment and disbelief. He has also inspired the creation of a memecoin on the platform Solana.
