= Muppet RaceMania =

2000 video game

- PAL cover art
- Developer: Traveller's Tales
- Publishers: EU: Sony Computer Entertainment; NA: Midway Games
- Director: Jon Burton
- Producers: James Dillon; Greg Duddle
- Designers: James Cunliffe; John Hodskinson
- Programmer: John Hodskinson
- Composers: Andy Blythe; Marten Joustra; Michael Giacchino
- Platform: PlayStation
- Release: UK: 21 April 2000; NA: 4 October 2000
- Genre: Racing
- Modes: Single-player, multiplayer

Muppet RaceMania is a 2000 racing video game developed by Traveller's Tales and published by Sony Computer Entertainment for the PlayStation. It was developed under Psygnosis' licence of The Muppets.

== Gameplay ==
The game includes 25 playable muppet characters and 25 vehicles. Players can race on 34 tracks based on locations throughout The Muppets franchise.

In a race, there are stars and fruits on the track which the racers can collect. A star gives the racer one of four weapons which can be used to attack other racers. Collecting fruit increases a colored gauge. Once the gauge is full, the racer can do one of two super moves: one that stymies the other racers, and one that makes the racer fly and move faster. The effect of the super move ends once the gauge empties.

== Reception ==
Reception

Aggregate score
Aggregator	Score
GameRankings	70%

Review scores
Publication	Score
Electronic Gaming Monthly	6/10
EP Daily	6/10
Game Informer	5/10
GameFan	63% (Note: Three critics of GameFan gave the game each a score of 84, 54, and 50.)
GameRevolution	B
GameSpot	5.1/10
IGN	8.3/10
Jeuxvideo.com	14/20
Next Generation	2/5
PlayStation Official Magazine – UK	9/10
Official U.S. PlayStation Magazine	3.5/5

The game received average reviews according to the review aggregation website GameRankings. However, Eric Bratcher of NextGen called it "A substandard kart racer that unsuccessfully relies upon the Muppets' huge charisma to overcome its technical shortcomings."
