= Jerry Nelson =

American puppeteer (1934–2012)

- Nelson with the Count in a Sesame Street publicity photograph from June 2012
- Born: July 10, 1934; Muskogee, Oklahoma, U.S.
- Died: August 23, 2012 (aged 78); Cape Cod, Massachusetts, U.S.
- Occupation: Puppeteer
- Years active: 1965–2012
- Spouses: Jacqueline Gordon (divorced); Jan Nelson (m. 1984)
- Children: 1

Jerry Nelson (July 10, 1934 – August 23, 2012) was an American puppeteer, best known for his work with the Muppets. Known for his wide range of characters and singing abilities, he performed Muppet characters on Sesame Street, The Muppet Show, Fraggle Rock, and various Muppet movies and specials.

== Early life ==
Nelson was born on July 10, 1934, in Muskogee, Oklahoma. He was raised in Tulsa, Oklahoma. When he was 11 years old, he saw a marionette at a department store, which inspired him to become a puppeteer. He served in the military in the 1950s.

== Career ==
On Sesame Street, Nelson's longest-running character was Count von Count, the counting vampire who takes delight in counting anything (and everything) he can. Nelson did the voice and puppetry for the Count from 1972 until his death in 2012. His other Muppet roles on that program were Herbert Birdsfoot, The Amazing Mumford, Herry Monster, Biff, Mr. Johnson, Simon Soundman, Mr. Chatterly, Frazzle, Little Jerry, and Sherlock Hemlock. He has also made a total of nine onscreen appearances on the show.

From 1971 to 1978, Nelson was the first puppeteer to perform Mr. Snuffleupagus. Reported back problems caused by the physical stress of the character forced him to bow out of the role, but in a 2009 interview Nelson provided a different explanation: "I was not loath to give that character up. But the reasons for giving it up were because at that time we were doing The Muppet Show and he was a real part of [Sesame Street], and they needed his presence. So they asked if I'd mind giving it up."

Nelson also performed many characters on The Muppet Show, including Sgt. Floyd Pepper (the bassist of the Electric Mayhem band), Pigs in Space star Dr. Julius Strangepork, the boomerang fish-throwing Lew Zealand, Kermit the Frog's nephew Robin the Frog, Gonzo's girlfriend Camilla the Chicken, the mad pyrotechnist Crazy Harry, and "the Phantom of the Muppet Show", Uncle Deadly. He performed Statler in the pilot episode but was replaced by Richard Hunt when he could not perform full-time in the first season. He was a full-time performer for the rest of the show's run. Nelson was also selected to play Statler after Hunt's death, after the end of the show.

Less prominent characters on the show include sportscaster Louis Kazagger, Pops the doorman, giant blue monster Thog, gossip columnist Fleet Scribbler, and Scooter's uncle, J.P. Grosse, who owned the theater. He originated the role of Fozzie Bear's mother in season 2 of The Muppet Show and reprised the role in the TV specials A Muppet Family Christmas, The Muppets at Walt Disney World, and the film The Muppet Christmas Carol.

Nelson performed the puppet and voice of Emmet in Emmet Otter's Jug-Band Christmas, a one-hour special that originally aired on CBC. He later performed the signature song from that show, "When the River Meets the Sea," as Robin, in a duet with John Denver for a Muppet Christmas special. That version of the song gets frequent radio airplay during the Christmas season (although the song is not seasonal). He and Louise Gold performed the song at Jim Henson's memorial service.

On Fraggle Rock, he performed Gobo Fraggle, Pa Gorg, and Marjory the Trash Heap. Frank Oz did not perform on Fraggle Rock, and Jim Henson and Hunt limited their time on the show, so they performed supporting characters. For this reason, Nelson was asked to perform Gobo, the central role on the show.

Nelson's characters were often singers or musicians. He performed the lead vocals for many songs as Floyd of the Electric Mayhem, Little Jerry of Little Jerry and the Monotones, Slim Wilson of Lubbock Lou and his Jughuggers, and a number of Anything Muppet bands. Most of his main characters in all three shows sang songs at one time or another.

In 2001, Nelson also performed the character voice of General Public in the Cartoon Network animated series Sheep in the Big City in the episode "Daddy Shearest". In December 2009, Nelson, who summered in Truro, Massachusetts on Cape Cod, released Truro Daydreams, an album of original songs.

He reprised the role of the announcer in The Muppets. His final performance as the announcer was part of the Jim Henson's Musical World concert at Carnegie Hall. Archive audio of his announcer role was reused in Muppets Most Wanted, which was dedicated to both Nelson and Jane Henson, wife of Muppets' creator Jim Henson.

== Personal life ==
Nelson had a daughter named Christine from his first marriage to Jacqueline Nelson Gordon. Christine had cystic fibrosis and died from the disease in 1982, after attending Rye Country Day School. Caring for her limited Nelson's involvement in The Muppet Show's first season. She made a speaking cameo appearance with him in the second Muppet movie, The Great Muppet Caper. He then married his second wife Jan Nelson in 1984, and they remained married until his death in 2012.

In 2004, Nelson announced that he would no longer be puppeteering his Muppet characters, citing health reasons. However, he continued to voice his characters on Sesame Street until his death on August 23, 2012. Matt Vogel currently performs most of Nelson's Muppet characters.

== Illness and death ==
Nelson suffered from prostate cancer, chronic obstructive pulmonary disease, and emphysema. He had gone through radiation therapy for cancer. For the last six years of his life, he required an oxygen tank to assist his breathing. He died on August 23, 2012, at his Cape Cod home from complications of his illnesses at the age of 78. Nelson was cremated by Boston's Neptune Society in Weymouth, Massachusetts. The film Muppets Most Wanted was dedicated to him and Jane Henson.

== Filmography ==
=== Film ===
Year	Title	Roles	Notes
1979	The Muppet Movie	Floyd Pepper, Robin the Frog, Crazy Harry, Camilla the Chicken, Lew Zealand, Uncle Deadly, Count von Count, Herry Monster, Biff, Mr. Johnson, Herbert Birdsfoot, Additional Muppets	
1981	The Great Muppet Caper	Pops, Floyd Pepper, Lew Zealand, Louis Kazagger, Slim Wilson, Additional Muppets	Puppeteer/voice; Nelson also made a cameo as a man walking in a park alongside his daughter, Christine
1984	The Muppets Take Manhattan	Floyd Pepper, Camilla the Chicken, Lew Zealand, Count von Count, Herry Monster, Elmo, Biff, Additional Muppets	
1985	Sesame Street Presents: Follow That Bird	Count von Count, Herry Monster, Biff	
1992	The Muppet Christmas Carol	Tiny Tim Cratchit (Robin the Frog), Jacob Marley (Statler), Lew Zealand, Ghost of Christmas Present, Ma Fozziwig, Additional Muppets	
1996	Muppet Treasure Island	Mad Monty, Blind Pew, Statler, Lew Zealand, Floyd Pepper, Calico, Additional Muppets	Nelson also makes a credited cameo as a butler
1999	Muppets from Space	Ubergonzo, Statler, Robin the Frog, Lew Zealand, Floyd Pepper, Additional Muppets	
1999	The Adventures of Elmo in Grouchland	Count von Count, Mr. Johnson, Grouch Mayor, Grouch Cop, Pestie, Additional Muppets	
2002	Kermit's Swamp Years	Statler	
2002	It's a Very Merry Muppet Christmas Movie	Robin the Frog, Statler, Floyd Pepper, Announcer	Voice
2008	Abby in Wonderland	Counter-pillar (Count von Count)	Voice
2011	The Muppets	Telethon Announcer	Uncredited; Final performance.
2014	Muppets Most Wanted	Muppet Show Announcer	Uncredited; Posthumous release; Archive footage; Dedicated to memory

=== Television ===
Year	Title	Roles	Notes
1969	Hey, Cinderella!	Featherstone, Stepsister #2	
1970–2012	Sesame Street	Count von Count (1972–2012), Herry Monster (1970–2003), Biff (1972–1999), Beautiful Day Monster (1969), Two-Headed Monster (left head, 1979–2000), Sherlock Hemlock (1970–1995, 2010), Snuffy (1971–1980), Frazzle (1973–1981, 1992, 1996–1998, 2001), The Amazing Mumford (1971–2011), Mr. Johnson (1971–2012), Fred the Wonder Horse, Farley, Herbert Birdsfoot, SAM the Robot (1972–1976), The Big Bad Wolf (1973–2011), Additional Muppets	
1976–1981	The Muppet Show	Floyd Pepper, Robin the Frog, Lew Zealand, Crazy Harry, Pops, Louis Kazagger, Camilla the Chicken, Thog, Uncle Deadly, Dr. Julius Strangepork, Slim Wilson, Bruno, Fleet Scribbler, Additional Muppets	
1977	Emmet Otter's Jug-Band Christmas	Emmet Otter, Weasel, Doc Bullfrog, Melissa Rabbit, Yancy Woodchuck	
1982	The Dark Crystal	Ritual Master skekZok and the Dying Emperor	
1983–1987	Fraggle Rock	Gobo Fraggle, Pa Gorg, Marjory the Trash Heap, Architect Doozer, Feenie Fraggle, Uncle Gobo, Additional Muppets	
1986	The Christmas Toy	Balthazar	
1987	A Muppet Family Christmas	Emily Bear, Robin the Frog, Floyd Pepper, Count von Count, Herry Monster, Gobo Fraggle, Camilla, Two-Headed Monster (Left-Head), Additional Muppets	
1989	The Jim Henson Hour	Beard, Orange Extreme, Evil McBad, Additional Muppets	Nelson also made various cameos on the show
1990	The Muppets Celebrate Jim Henson	Robin the Frog, Lew Zealand, Floyd Pepper, Gobo Fraggle, Additional Muppets	
1993	Billy Bunny's Animal Songs	Cecil Bear, Frog, Raccoon, Turtle	
1996–1998	Muppets Tonight	Statler, Lew Zealand, Mama Fiama, Dr. Watson, Clarissa, The Mad Bomber, Phil, The Head of The Network, Additional Muppets	
1998	Elmo's World	Count Von Count, Herry Monster, The Two Headed Monster (left-head), Mr. Johnson, Fred the Wonder Horse, Tornado, Accordion, Cactus, The Big Bad Wolf, Football, Mr. Hat, Announcer, Various	
2001	Sheep in the Big City	General Public	Guest voice

=== Video games ===
Year	Title	Roles	Notes
1988	Sesame Street: Magic on Sesame Street	Count von Count	
1988	Muppets Studios Presents: You're the Director	Dr. Julius Strangepork, Lew Zealand, Robin the Frog	
1988	Muppet Madness	Dr. Julius Strangepork, Lew Zealand, Chicken	
1991	Sesame Street Letters	Count von Count	Voice
1991	Sesame Street: Countdown	Count von Count	Voice
1994	Sesame Street: Counting Cafe	Mr. Johnson	Voice
1995	Sesame Street: Let's Make a Word!	Two-Headed Monster (left head)	Voice
1996	Sesame Street: Get Set to Learn!	Count von Count, Martians	Voice
1996	The Muppet CD-ROM: Muppets Inside	Statler, Lew Zealand, Crazy Harry, The Muppet Newsman	
1996	Muppet Treasure Island	Statler, Lew Zealand, Pops, Blind Pew, Mad Monty, Mr. Plageman	
1997	Sesame Street: Search and Learn Adventures	Sherlock Hemlock, The Amazing Mumford, Count von Count, Mr. Johnson	Voice
1998	Sesame Street: Elmo Through the Looking-Glass	Two-Headed Monster (left head)	Voice
1998	Elmo's Reading Basics	Sherlock Hemlock, One Martian	Voice
1999	Elmo's Number Journey	Count von Count	Voice
1999	Elmo's Letter Adventure	Count von Count	Voice
2000	Sesame Street: Ernie's Adventures in Space	Count von Count, Martians, The Customer	Voice
2001	Elmo's Word: Shoes, Bugs & Farms!	Sherlock Hemlock, Old MacDonald (Mr. Johnson)	Voice
2003	Muppets Party Cruise	Statler, Lew Zealand, Floyd Pepper, Crazy Harry, Dr. Julius Strangepork, Camilla	Voice
2012	Sesame Street: Elmo's Musical Monsterpiece	Count von Count	Voice
