= Gonzo (Muppet) =

Muppet character

- The Muppets character
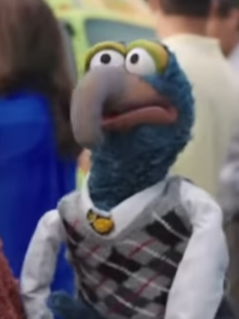
- First appearance: The Great Santa Claus Switch (1970)
- Created by: Dave Goelz; Jim Henson; Jerry Juhl
- Performed by: Dave Goelz

In-universe information
- Alias: The Great (prefaced or postfaced with his name)
- Species: Muppet
- Occupation: Stunt performer, plumber, artist
- Significant other: Camilla the Chicken
- Nationality: American

Gonzo (Note: Name also either prefaced or postfaced with Great (i.e., the Great Gonzo or Gonzo the Great).) is a Muppet character from the sketch comedy television series The Muppet Show, known for his eccentric passion for stunt performance. Aside from his trademark enthusiasm for performance art, another defining trait of Gonzo is the ambiguity of his species, which has become a running gag in the franchise. He has been considered to be of various origins, including a Frackle in his debut appearance in special The Great Santa Claus Switch (1970), an extraterrestrial in Muppets from Space (1999) or an avian creature.

Developed and performed by Dave Goelz, Gonzo made his first appearance in The Great Santa Claus Switch, as the "Cigar Box Frackle". Originally introduced as a minor character in The Muppet Show, he soon evolved into one of the franchise's primary characters. Gonzo has appeared in every Muppet film, including The Muppet Christmas Carol (1992), where he portrayed author Charles Dickens and developed a double act with Rizzo the Rat.

== History ==
The prototype of Gonzo appeared in The Great Santa Claus Switch, "as a generic gruff baddie". Jim Henson selected this Frackle as the basis for Gonzo, and gave the character to puppeteer Dave Goelz. Gonzo was created as a character with low self-esteem, as written by Jerry Juhl, with Goelz acknowledging he put himself into that interpretation. Later, with Henson's approval, they reworked the eyes to allow the character to convey way more excitement, and a "zany, bombastic appreciation for life".

Gonzo has had several performances such as his 1979 song from The Muppet Movie, "I'm Going to Go Back There Someday". He became known for his stunts as acts within The Muppet Show and beyond, with the quote "Tonight, ladies and gentlemen, I will eat this rubber tire to the music of The Flight of the Bumblebee... Music, maestro!"

In 1992, he played the part of Charles Dickens in The Muppet Christmas Carol, as director Brian Henson said Gonzo was the most improbable Muppet to do so. Here, he developed a double act with Rizzo the Rat, narrating and breaking the fourth wall, with Rizzo challenging Gonzo's claims to be Dickens. The Gonzo and Rizzo partnership was continued in Muppet Treasure Island (1996) and Muppets from Space (1999). Along with Kermit and Rizzo, Gonzo gave an audio commentary for the Muppets from Space DVD.

In The Muppets, it was revealed that he had become a powerful plumbing magnate since the Muppets split up, possibly as a nod to his being a plumber prior to meeting Kermit and Fozzie in The Muppet Movie. In the 2015 television series The Muppets, Gonzo is a major character and the head writer of Miss Piggy's late night talk show, Up Late with Miss Piggy.

== Character ==
Gonzo is not a puppet version of a human or a recognizable animal. He has an unusual appearance, which includes purple-blue fur, purple feathers on his head, bug-eyes, and a long, hooked nose, referred to as a "beak". In The Muppet Show and The Muppet Movie, he performed as a performance artist, stunt double and daredevil under the name "The Great Gonzo" (or "Gonzo the Great").

Gonzo is good friends with all of the Muppets, but performed a double act with Rizzo the Rat since The Muppet Christmas Carol. Gonzo has a long-standing romantic relationship with Camilla the Chicken, whom he first courted in a 1979 episode of The Muppet Show guest starring Leslie Uggams, and directed Camilla and the other chickens in 2008 YouTube videos.

=== Species ===
A running gag related to Gonzo is that it is unknown what species he is. Gonzo's self-identity is a "whatever". In The Muppet Movie, Kermit, while conversing with his inner self, refers to Gonzo as "a little like a turkey". In the film The Great Muppet Caper, Gonzo is shipped to England in a crate labeled "Whatever" (while Kermit the Frog and Fozzie Bear are respectively labeled "Frog" and "Bear"). Not long afterward, the three land in a pond in front of Robert Morley, who ponders if it is raining cats and dogs, but Kermit and Fozzie respectively reply, "Actually, we're bears and frogs", with Gonzo adding, "And Gonzos." In A Muppet Family Christmas, when Gonzo states to the Christmas Turkey that Camilla is his girlfriend, the Christmas Turkey says "You're not even a bird!" In the Muppet Treasure Island CD-ROM Game, Gonzo and Rizzo the Rat land in a bucket of molasses, following the dialogue of a carriage driver saying "It's raining rats and... whatevers". In The Muppets' Wizard of Oz, Gonzo played a Tin Man-ish character primarily known as the "Tin Thing". In Jim Henson's Muppet Babies, Gonzo (voiced by Russi Taylor) is simply referred to, most often by Baby Piggy, as a "weirdo" or "blue weirdo".

In Muppets from Space, Gonzo has a starring role. In the film, he is shown to be an alien, and his alien family tracks him down with the intention of welcoming him back into his long-lost community; before their departure, they ask him to return to space with them. Gonzo says goodbye to the Muppets, but soon realizes that he would be abandoning the friends who have been like his family all along, prompting him to decline the aliens' offer.

=== Gender ===
In one episode of Muppet Babies parodying Cinderella, Gonzo puts on the glass slipper and transforms into "Gonzorella". Gonzo later admits to his fellow Muppets that "the princess who came to your ball tonight... was me." When Miss Piggy asks why Gonzo did not tell them, Gonzo replies, "Because you all expected me to look a certain way. I don't want you to be upset with me... but I don't want to do things just because that's the way they've been done, either. I wanna be me." When asked about the episode, producer Tom Warburton said that early on the plan was to make Gonzo appear in a skirt as if it were no big deal, because "Gonzo is always 200 percent Gonzo 347 percent of the time", but the writing team decided to take it further with the Cinderella arc. Warburton remarked that "It was just SO wonderfully Gonzo. We hope they inspire kids watching to be 347% of themselves in their own way, too." One fan commented that this episode was in line with Gonzo's character, pointing to episodes of the 1980s Muppet Babies series where Gonzo wore dresses.

Before the airing of the Gonzorella episode, some fans have analyzed Gonzo through a queer lens. These fans note in their analyses that ambiguity and nonconformity are central to his identity as a character, and that those themes are often seen in LGBTQ characters and media and reflect real-world experiences of many LGBTQ people, which leads to some LGBTQ viewers identifying with Gonzo.

== Filmography ==
- The Great Santa Claus Switch (1970)
- The Muppet Show (1976–1981) (TV)
- The Muppet Movie (1979)
- The Great Muppet Caper (1981)
- The Muppets Take Manhattan (1984)
- Muppet Babies (1984–1991) (TV) (voiced by Russi Taylor)
- The Muppet Christmas Carol (1992) as Charles Dickens
- Muppet Treasure Island (1996)
- Muppets Tonight (1996–2000) (TV)
- Muppets from Space (1999)
- It's a Very Merry Muppet Christmas Movie (2002) (TV)
- The Muppets' Wizard of Oz (2005) (TV) as Himself and the Tin Thing
- A Muppets Christmas: Letters to Santa (2008) (TV)
- Studio DC: Almost Live (2008) (TV)
- The Muppets (2011)
- Lady Gaga and the Muppets Holiday Spectacular (2013) (TV)
- Muppets Most Wanted (2014)
- The Muppets (2015–2016) (TV)
- Muppet Babies (2018–2022) (TV) (voiced by Benjamin Diskin)
- Muppets Now (2020) (Disney+)
- Muppets Haunted Mansion (2021) (Disney+)
- The Game Awards 2023 (2023) (YouTube, Twitch)
- The Muppet Show (2026) (TV)

== Cultural impact ==
Gonzo's appearance in the animated spin-off Muppet Babies.

Though primarily performed by Dave Goelz, he has also been voiced in animated form by Hal Rayle in Little Muppet Monsters. Brett O'Quinn performed Gonzo in Muppets Ahoy!, a 2006 Disney Cruise Line show. An infant-aged version of Gonzo appeared as a regular character in the animated spin-off television series Muppet Babies, voiced by Russi Taylor, alongside Kermit, Miss Piggy, and other central Muppet Show figures. Baby Gonzo is one of the cartoon characters featured in Cartoon All-Stars to the Rescue. Baby Gonzo later returned in the 2018 Muppet Babies series, voiced by Benjamin Diskin.

Gonzo was featured on the #28 Havoline Ford of Ricky Rudd in the 2002 Tropicana 400 in an advertising campaign in which Gonzo and his fellow Muppets were featured on a select few NASCAR Nextel Cup Series race cars. Gonzo also appeared alongside Gonzo's fellow Muppets on the Halloween 2011 episode of WWE Raw.

Gonzo was announced as the grand marshal for the Auto Club 400 NASCAR Sprint Cup Series race at Auto Club Speedway in Fontana, Ca. to give the famous command of "Drivers, Start your engines". Gonzo fulfilled his duty on March 23, 2014.

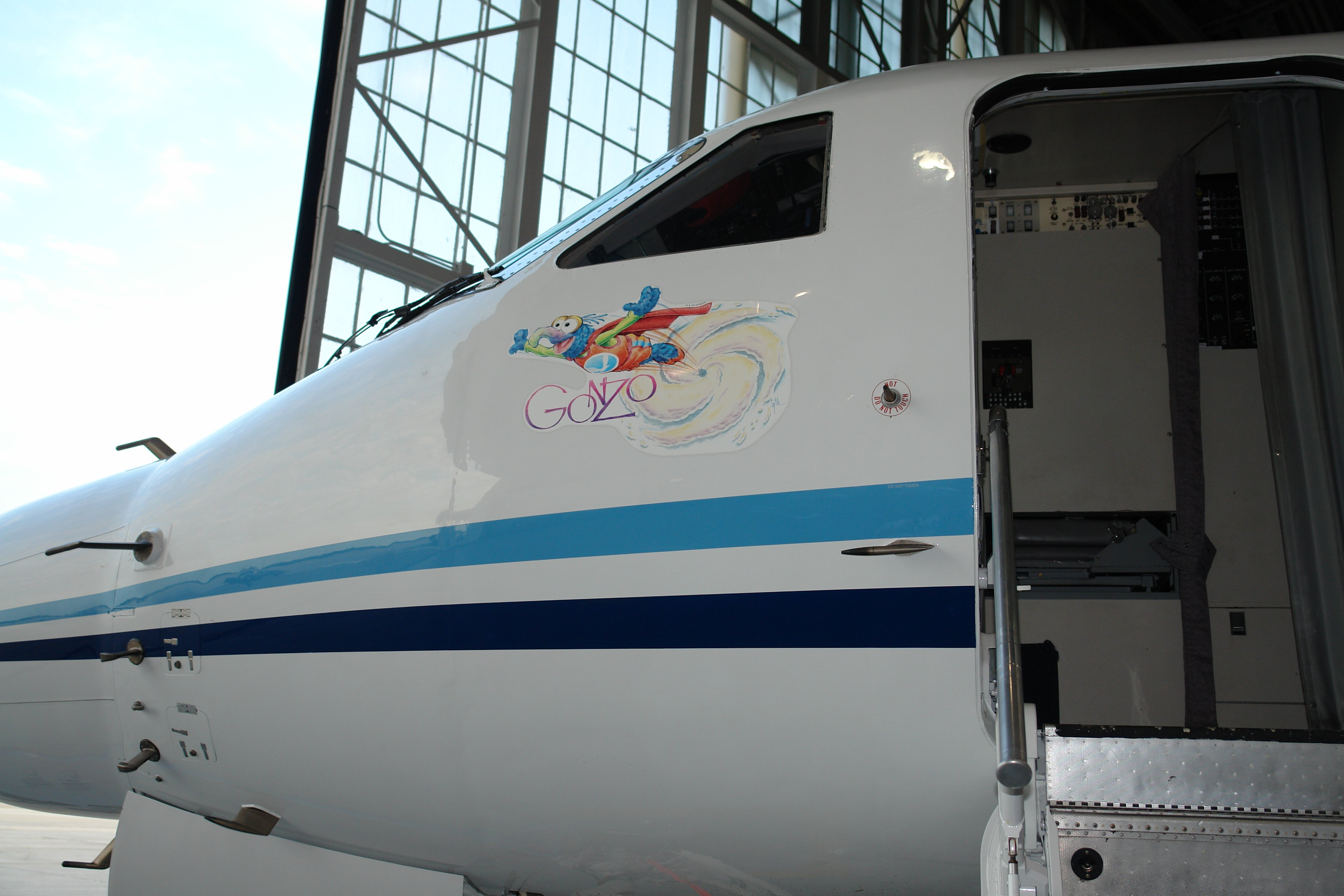
NOAA's Gulfstream IV N49RF, named for Gonzo.

Gonzo is also the namesake to the CT-142 Bombardier Dash 8 used by the Canadian Armed Forces for Air Combat Systems Officer training due to the blue paint job and elongated nose housing a specialized radar. A similar flying example is the Gulfstream IV light jetliner bearing US registration N49RF, flown for severe weather research by the US Federal National Oceanic and Atmospheric Administration, and is also named for Gonzo as portside nose art.

Gonzo Station was a U.S. Navy acronym for "Gulf of Oman Naval Zone of Operations" or "Gulf of Oman Northern Zone." It was used to designate an area of carrier-based naval operations by the U.S. Navy and U.S. Marine Corps in the Indian Ocean during the 1979-1981 Iranian Hostage Crisis and the "Tanker War" between the United States and the Islamic Republic of Iran. Some U.S. military patches for personnel serving in the area depicted Gonzo the Muppet.

== Reception ==
Reviewing Muppets from Space in 1999, Roger Ebert found the most humorous part to be Gonzo being denied entry to Noah's Ark for not having a second member of his species, and expressed sympathy for his loneliness as an extraterrestrial, stranded since the Roswell UFO incident, adding "Poor guy (or whatever he is)". In 2012, The Guardian's Lizzy Dening, reviewing the Muppet films, identified Gonzo as a favorite. That year, The Daily Beast wrote about appreciation for the Muppets in the LGBT community, calling Gonzo "the queerest Muppet of all".

In 2015, Today.com, in reviewing the Humpty Dance YouTube video, referred to Gonzo himself as a "classic Muppet". That year, The Huffington Post identified Gonzo as a popular Muppet, saying to his fans, "People just don't GET you" adding "And nothing would ever be the same without you."

== Bibliography ==
- Culp, Christopher M. (2015). "Life's Like a Movie". Jim Henson and Philosophy: Imagination and the Magic of Mayhem. Rowman & Littlefield. ISBN 9781442246652.
- Dale, Timothy; Foy, Joseph, eds. (July 15, 2015). Jim Henson and Philosophy: Imagination and the Magic of Mayhem. Rowman & Littlefield. ISBN 9781442246652.
- Graham, Anissa M. (2012). "Muppet Memes". The Wider Worlds of Jim Henson: Essays on His Work and Legacy Beyond The Muppet Show and Sesame Street. McFarland. ISBN 9780786469864.
- Garlen, Jennifer C.; Graham, Anissa M., eds. (2009). Kermit Culture: Critical Perspectives on Jim Henson's Muppets. McFarland. ISBN 9780786453757.
- Glavin, John, ed. (2017). Dickens Adapted. Routledge. ISBN 9781351944564 – via Google Books.
- Jones, Brian Jay (2016). Jim Henson: The Biography. Random House Publishing Group. ISBN 9780345526120.
- Shemin, Craig (2014). Disney's The Muppets Character Encyclopedia. New York: DK Publishing. ISBN 9781465417480.
