= Fraggle Rock =

Children's television series

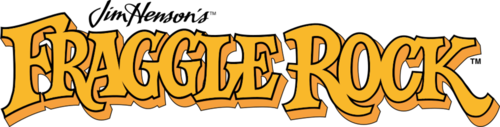
- Also known as: Jim Henson's Fraggle Rock; Fraggle Rock with Jim Henson's Muppets
- Genre: Comedy; Children's; Slapstick; Fantasy; Musical
- Created by: Jim Henson
- Directed by: Eric Till
- Starring: Gerry Parkes as Doc (US and Canada); Michel Robin as Doc (France); Hans Helmut Dickow as Doc (Germany); Fulton Mackay as The Captain (UK); John Gordon Sinclair as P.K. (UK); Simon O'Brien as B.J. (UK); Muppet performers: Jerry Nelson; Dave Goelz; Steve Whitmire; Kathryn Mullen; Karen Prell; Richard Hunt; Jim Henson
- Opening theme: "Down at Fraggle Rock"
- Ending theme: "Down at Fraggle Rock"
- Composers: Philip Balsam; Dennis Lee
- Countries of origin: United Kingdom; United States; Canada
- Original language: English
- No. of seasons: 5
- No. of episodes: 96 (list of episodes)

Production
- Executive producer: Jim Henson
- Producer: Jerry Juhl
- Production locations: Toronto, Ontario, Canada; TVS Television Centre, Maidstone, United Kingdom; FSM Television Studio
- Editor: Christopher Roy
- Running time: 25 minutes
- Production company: Henson Associates, Inc.

Original release
- Network: CBC (Canada); ITV (UK); HBO (US)
- Release: January 10, 1983 – March 30, 1987

Related
- Fraggle Rock: The Animated Series; Fraggle Rock: Back to the Rock; The Doozers

Fraggle Rock (also known as Jim Henson's Fraggle Rock or Fraggle Rock with Jim Henson's Muppets) is a children's musical fantasy comedy puppet television series created by Jim Henson. It follows a group of interconnected societies of Muppet creatures.

An international co-production of Canada, the United Kingdom and the United States, Fraggle Rock was co-produced by British television company Television South (TVS), the CBC, American pay television service HBO, and Henson Associates. Unlike The Muppet Show and Sesame Street, which had been created for a single market and later adapted for international markets, Fraggle Rock was intended from the start to be an international production, and the entire show was constructed with this in mind. At least four different versions of the human wraparound segments were produced separately to air in different countries.

Following the success of the Fraggle Rock: Rock On! shorts which aired on Apple TV+ in April 2020, a reboot of Fraggle Rock was ordered by the streaming service. Known as Fraggle Rock: Back to the Rock, it premiered on January 21, 2022.

== History ==
Fraggle Rock debuted in 1983 as one of the first shows involving the collaboration of Henson International Television (HiT Entertainment from 1989), the international arm of Jim Henson Productions. The co-production brought together British regional ITV franchise-holder Television South (TVS), CBC Television (Canada), and U.S. pay-TV service Home Box Office and the Jim Henson Company (then known as Henson Associates). Filming took place on a Toronto soundstage. The avant-garde poet bpNichol worked as one of the show's writers. In the early days of development, the script called the Fraggles "Woozles" pending the devising of a more suitable name.

Henson described the Fraggle Rock series as "a high-energy, raucous musical romp. It's a lot of silliness. It's wonderful." The program proved accessible to audiences of all ages, and used the fantasy creatures as an allegory to deal with serious issues such as prejudice, spirituality, personal identity, the environment, and social conflict.

In 2009, as part of the Jim Henson Foundation's donation of puppets to the Center for Puppetry Arts, the Atlanta museum displayed many of the original puppet characters from Fraggle Rock in their exhibition Jim Henson: Wonders from his Workshop.

== International co-productions ==
The producers made the series with the intention of it airing in various forms internationally. That concept grew out of Jim Henson's experience adapting Sesame Street to the requirements of foreign markets. The human "wraparound" segments were produced separately in several countries, so the viewer could always relate to the world of the program. The series has appeared now in over 10 countries and languages. The head producer was Wesley James Tomlinson.

- The original North American version, filmed in Toronto, features an inventor named Doc (played by Gerry Parkes) and his dog Sprocket. This wraparound was also used in Australia, New Zealand, the Netherlands, the Republic of Ireland, Scandinavia, Spain, Japan, and Eastern Europe. Dutch, Scandinavian, Spanish, Japanese, and Eastern European shows were dubbed in their respective languages.
- The British inserts were filmed first at the TVS Television Theatre in Gillingham, Kent (since closed and demolished), and later at their larger studio complex in Maidstone, and presents Fraggle Rock as a rock-filled sea island with a lighthouse. Exterior footage was that of St Anthony's Lighthouse located near Falmouth in Cornwall. The lighthouse keeper is The Captain (played by Fulton Mackay), a retired sailor who lives with his faithful dog Sprocket. In the third season, as Mackay had died in 1987, the role was played by John Gordon Sinclair as P.K., (the Captain's nephew) and in the fourth and final season by Simon O'Brien as B.J. (son of the lighthouse's owner, Mr. Bertwhistle). In 2014, 35 of these British wraparounds were missing, believed wiped; all wraparounds have been subsequently recovered. Nickelodeon repeated it in the UK from 1993, as did Boomerang and Cartoonito in 2007. The episodes shown were the original North American versions.
- In France, the wraparound segments take place in a bakery with its version of Doc (played by Michel Robin) who worked as a baker and a French Sprocket called Croquette. Doc inherited the home from his eccentric Uncle Georges (who was a noted inventor). Thus, when the frame story required the use of a mechanical device, Doc would find yet another of Uncle Georges's machines. Plot-lines also frequently involved an unseen character, Madame Pontaven, an elegant lady whom Doc repeatedly attempted to impress and invite to dinner with no success. Not all of the 96 episodes were produced in French. The original French broadcast only aired the first three seasons of the series, lasting from October 16, 1983 until September 1, 1986 on FR3.
- In the German version, the action takes place beneath the workshop of the inventor Doc (played by Hans Helmut Dickow) and was filmed at FSM Television Studio in Munich. The series was named Die Fraggles and was first broadcast on ZDF on November 12, 1983. Out of the 96 produced episodes in total, only 85 episodes were presented in German. The remaining 11 episodes (three episodes from Season 4 and eight episodes from Season 5) used its original English audio.

== Characters ==
Besides humans, whom the Fraggles refer to as "Silly Creatures", there are three main intelligent anthropomorphic species in the Fraggle Rock environment: Fraggles, Doozers and Gorgs. The Fraggles and Doozers live in a system of natural caves called Fraggle Rock that are filled with all manner of creatures and features and which connect to at least two different areas:

- The Land of the Gorgs.
- "Outer Space" (our world).

One of the main themes of the series is that, although the three species depend on the other for their survival, they usually fail to communicate due to vast differences in their biology and culture. The series mainly follows the adventures of five Fraggles, each with their own personality: pragmatic Gobo, artistic Mokey, indecisive Wembley, superstitious Boober, and adventurous Red. Some of the characters' names are film industry in-jokes. For example, Uncle Traveling Matt is a reference to the traveling matte technique used with blue screen to give the impression a character is somewhere they are not; Gobo is named after a shaped metal grill placed over a theater light to produce interesting shadows (window shapes, leaves, etc.) and Red is a reference to a "redhead", another name for an 800w film light.

=== Fraggles ===
Marjory the Trash Heap, 1988

Fraggles are small anthropomorphic creatures, typically 18 inches (46 cm) tall, that come in a variety of colors and have fur tuft tipped tails. Fraggles live a generally carefree life, spending most of their time (they have a thirty-minute work week) playing, exploring, and generally enjoying themselves. They live mainly on radishes and Doozer sticks, made of ground-up radishes and the material with which the Doozers build their constructions. The Fraggles seek wisdom from Marjory the Trash Heap, who is located in a corner of the Gorgs' garden. Marjory the Trash Heap is a large, matronly, sentient compost heap. According to her rat-like companions Philo and Gunge, the Trash Heap "knows all and sees all." By her own admission, she has "everything".

=== Doozers ===
Within Fraggle Rock lives a second species of small humanoid creatures, the pudgy, green, and industrious Doozers. They stand about 6 inches (15 cm) tall ("knee-high to a Fraggle"). Doozers are in a sense the opposite of Fraggles; their lives are dedicated to working and industry. Doozers spend much of their time busily constructing all manner of scaffolding throughout Fraggle Rock, using miniature construction equipment and wearing hardhats and work boots. Doozers build their constructions out of an edible candy-like substance (manufactured from radishes) which is greatly enjoyed by Fraggles. This is essentially the only interaction between Doozers and Fraggles; Doozers spend most of their time building just for the sake of it, and Fraggles spend much of their time eating Doozer buildings which they consider delicious.

The Doozers say in an early episode that "architecture is meant to be enjoyed", and in the episode "The Preachification of Convincing John", Mokey prevents the other Fraggles from eating the building work, believing it to be insensitive to the Doozers. As a result, the Doozer building eventually takes over Fraggle Rock, and once full, the Doozers plan on moving out as they have nowhere left to build. They explain that they want the Fraggles to eat their work to create space for more building work to go up again. Despite this co-dependence, the Doozers generally maintain a low opinion of Fraggles, considering them frivolous. The Doozers also seem to have little knowledge of the universe outside Fraggle Rock; early in the series, they are unaware of the existence of the Gorgs or their garden. However, there was also one time when Doc found, in his workshop, an ancient-looking Doozer helmet, indicating that the Doozers may have explored outside Fraggle Rock into "Outer Space" at some time in their forgotten past.

Adolescent Doozers come of age with a "taking the helmet" ceremony, in which they proudly accept their Doozer helmet from the Doozer Architect, after swearing to live a life of hard work. Rarely, a Doozer will refuse to "take the helmet"; a once in a generation occurrence that is generally met with shock and disbelief in the Doozer community. Such non-conformist Doozers can, however, find places of high regard in Doozer society, due to the advantages of their more creative way of thinking.

=== Gorgs ===
Outside another exit from Fraggle Rock live a small family of Gorgs, fat furry humanoids standing about 15 feet (4.6 m). The husband and wife of the family, Pa, and Ma, consider themselves the King and Queen of the Universe, with their son Junior Gorg as its prince and heir-apparent, but to all appearances, they are simple farmers with a rustic house and garden patch. In "The Gorg Who Would Be King", Pa says he has ruled for 742 years.

Fraggles are considered pests by the Gorgs, as they often steal radishes from the garden. The Fraggles do not consider it stealing. The Gorgs use the radishes to make anti-vanishing cream, without which they disappear headfirst.

=== The Silly Creatures of Outer Space ===
In the North American, French, and German versions of Fraggle Rock (along with most other foreign dubs), the connection between Fraggle Rock and Outer Space is a small hole in the wall of the workshop of an eccentric inventor named Doc and his (Muppet) dog Sprocket. In the British version, the situation is much the same, except that the hole leads into the living quarters of a lighthouse where the keeper lives with his dog, Sprocket.

Gobo must go out into Doc's workshop to retrieve the postcards from his uncle Matt from the wastebasket where Doc throws them, assuming they are misdelivered. Traveling Matt (a pun on traveling matte, the film compositing technique used in his segments) is exploring the wider world, observing humans, and reporting humorously false conclusions about their everyday behavior.

Sprocket often sees and chases Gobo, but can't convince Doc anything lives beyond the wall. Sprocket and Doc have many similar miscommunications throughout the series, given the language barrier, but overall, they understand each other quite well.

In the final episode arc of the original North American version of the show, Doc himself finally meets Gobo and befriends him. Gobo tells Doc that Fraggles refer to humans as "silly creatures", and apologizes. Doc tells him that he thinks that it is a very good name for humans. Unfortunately in the final episode, Doc and Sprocket have to move to another state, but the Fraggles discover a magic tunnel that allows them to visit Doc and Sprocket's new home easily at any time.

== Episodes ==
Season	Episodes	Originally released	
Season	Episodes	First released	Last released
1	24	January 10, 1983	July 4, 1983
2	24	January 2, 1984	June 11, 1984
3	22	December 24, 1984	May 27, 1985
4	13	January 6, 1986	March 31, 1986
5	13	January 5, 1987	March 30, 1987

== Broadcast history ==
The CBC/HBO version of the series has been broadcast and dubbed in 95 countries. The series airs on Channel 7, TV One, Doordarshan, Workpoint TV, KRO, Sveriges Television, NHK, NRK, and GBR TV. Others were broadcast on Coub as an uploaded video, and others broadcast on TVtropolis (Canada), Bolivision (Bolivia), and CNC3 (Trinidad and Tobago).

After the show ended on HBO in 1987, the channel started to rerun the series. In 1988, it ran on TNT. The show aired on Disney Channel from October 1, 1992 to September 30, 1996. From 1999 to 2001, the show moved to Odyssey Network, which had recently been purchased by Henson and Hallmark. After Hallmark took full control, it discontinued the reruns. From October 10, 2010, to October 4, 2014, reruns aired on The Hub as part of the channel's launch.

In 2007, Fraggle Rock reruns aired on television internationally. On July 23, 2007, Boomerang and Cartoonito started repeating episodes of the original North American production of Fraggle Rock in the UK, as they were unable to use the UK edits. In January 2013, ITV broadcast two episodes of this version as part of its Old Skool Weekend feature on the CITV channel.

On December 12, 2015, the remastered "The Bells of Fraggle Rock" episode debuted alongside Henson's remastered Emmet Otter's Jug-Band Christmas on ABC Family in its 25 Days of Christmas programming block. Fraggle Rock was available on HBO Now in HD and in 2016 the series began to air reruns on HBO Family.

In 2019, Fraggle Rock debuts along with the Henson classic content on Amazon Prime Video in North America, United Kingdom, Australia, New Zealand, Scandinavia, Finland, and Iceland.

On May 26, 2020, Apple TV+ announced that, alongside a series order for a reboot, they had acquired the exclusive streaming rights to the previous seasons of Fraggle Rock in the 100 countries the service is available in, making the series the first piece of non-original content available on the service.

== Home media ==
=== Australia ===
Magna Pacific published the American version of Fraggle Rock on Region 4 DVD in 2007. The DVD set Fraggle Rock: The Complete Fourth Season actually includes seasons four and five. The DVDs have no special features.

A set of plush dolls of Gobo, Wembley, Boober, and Red were released by Sababa Toys, each accompanied by a DVD featuring two episodes of the show, and one episode of the animated series.

=== United Kingdom ===
Twelve UK episodes were released on VHS and DVD by Columbia TriStar Home Entertainment in April 2004. TVS, the original ITV broadcaster, has passed through several owners since dropping out of the ITV network in 1992 and it was believed only these 12 episodes had survived. The research found more episodes, but many of the original 95 remained lost. HiT Entertainment has tried unsuccessfully to locate the missing episodes, including extensive inquiries with The Jim Henson Company both in the UK and the US. British television channels have consequently had to make do with the original US versions; such was the case with Boomerang and Cartoonito in 2007. In addition to the unknown fate of the physical master material, much of the original TVS production paperwork and sales documentation has been lost during the intervening years. This problem affects the majority of the TV program archive, preventing any commercial exploitation.

As of December 2017, search efforts and returned episodes from private collectors - mostly home recordings on VHS - have raised the number of episodes to 95, with only one episode - "Gobo’s School For Explorers", missing. In December 2020 TV preservation company Kaleidoscope announced via their Facebook page that VHS copies of all episodes had been located and transferred from the collection of producer Victor Pemberton. In 2010, Lionsgate Home Entertainment the UK released seasons 1-3 in complete season box sets. These releases are the same as the American box sets, except without bonus features. However, seasons 4 and 5 have never, as of 2024, been commercially been released in the UK.

=== United States ===
HBO Video, previously known as HBO/Cannon Video and Thorn EMI/HBO Video, released a collection of single-episode VHS tapes during the 1980s through Jim Henson Video.

In 1993, Buena Vista Home Video, under their Jim Henson Video label released five Fraggle Rock VHS tapes with two episodes each.

HIT Entertainment released several single-disc DVDs with three episodes each (two in the VHS counterparts) plus bonus episodes which could be unlocked by completing a trivia game before releasing the first three seasons of Fraggle Rock on DVD in Region 1 between September 2005 and September 2007. It released a complete series box set on November 4, 2008, but did not release the final season in a separate release. Season 4 had originally been scheduled to be released on the same day as the complete series set but at the last minute, it was scrapped and was never released.

In 2009, Lionsgate Home Entertainment reached a deal with The Jim Henson Company to release Fraggle Rock on DVD. It subsequently released the final season on DVD for the first time on November 3, 2009. On the same day, the "Complete Series" collection was re-released with new packaging (due to numerous complaints about the previous release).

In 2013, Vivendi Visual Entertainment acquired the license to release Jim Henson Company DVDs, including Fraggle Rock. Season 1 was re-released on March 12, 2013, followed by Season 2 on April 16, Season 3 on May 14, and Season 4 on June 18. A complete series set was also released on May 14 as Fraggle Rock – The 30th Anniversary Collection. This 22-disc set features all 96 episodes of the series as well as bonus features. A six-episode DVD was released with the title Meet the Fraggles.

On July 11, 2018, Sony Pictures Home Entertainment announced that they would be releasing a complete series set of Fraggle Rock on Blu-ray in honor of the show's 35th anniversary. The 12-disc set includes remastered versions of all 96 episodes of the series in high-definition, and includes all features from the previous DVD season releases as well as adding new material such as a 1993 Today Show segment featuring Uncle Traveling Matt, a series of on-set videos with creator Jim Henson, and all 13 episodes of Fraggle Rock: The Animated Series. It was released on September 25, 2018.

DVD name	Release date	Ep #	Additional information
Fraggle Rock: Complete First Season	September 6, 2005	24	Jim Henson's Fraggle Rock notepad, Behind the Scenes Documentary narrated by Jim Henson, Interviews with the cast and creators, Deluxe collectors box.
Fraggle Rock: Complete Second Season	September 5, 2006	24	Jim Henson's Creatures and places of Fraggle Rock notepad, Steve Whitmire's Home Videos, Deluxe Collectors Box and tribute to Jerry Juhl.
Fraggle Rock: Complete Third Season	September 11, 2007	24	All-new featurettes and interviews with Fraggle Rock cast and creators, Deluxe embossed collector's packaging.
Fraggle Rock: Complete Final Season	November 3, 2009	24	All-new featurettes and interviews with Fraggle Rock cast and creators.
Fraggle Rock: Complete Series Collection	November 3, 2009	96	All 96 episodes in one collectible package art, original Fraggle Rock illustrated poster, all-new featurettes, and interviews with Fraggle Rock cast and creators.
Fraggle Rock: The Complete Series	September 25, 2018	96	All 96 episodes remastered in HD with special features from previous releases and limited edition packaging; all episodes of Fraggle Rock: The Animated Series included.

== Spin-offs ==
=== Animated series ===
An animated Fraggle Rock series aired for one season on NBC's Saturday morning lineup in 1987. The cartoon series introduced some Fraggles, Doozers, and other cave creatures exclusive to the series.

=== A Muppet Family Christmas ===
Doc, Sprocket the Dog, Gobo Fraggle, Wembley Fraggle, Boober Fraggle, Mokey Fraggle, Red Fraggle, and Uncle Traveling Matt appear in A Muppet Family Christmas. Doc and Sprocket rent the farmhouse of Fozzie Bear's mother while she plans to go to Malibu until Fozzie shows up with his friends. Doc and Sprocket end up adjusting to the Muppets and the characters from Sesame Street. Kermit the Frog and his nephew Robin find a Fraggle hole in the basement and enter Fraggle Rock where they encounter the five main Fraggles. Large Marvin Fraggle and other background Fraggles make appearances as well. During the finale, the five Fraggles come up where Uncle Traveling Matt is seen sitting near Doc and Sprocket. In the final scenes, Jim Henson washes the dishes while Sprocket dries them.

=== The Doozers ===
In 2012, The Jim Henson Company and DHX Media announced a computer-animated spin-off to Fraggle Rock, titled The Doozers, targeted at children between ages 4 and 7. It focuses on four young Doozers named Spike, Mollybolt, Flex and Daisy Wheel, who live at Doozer Creek.

The series began airing on Hulu on April 25, 2014.

=== Canceled feature film ===
In September 2005, The Jim Henson Company announced it was working on a film adaptation of Fraggle Rock, known as Fraggle Rock: The Movie, with the aim of a release in 2009. The story allegedly involves the original Fraggle characters.

In October 2006, Darkhorizons.com reported "Henson's company has hired executive producer Ahmet Zappa (The Monstrous Memoirs of a Mighty McFearless) to write a treatment for the film which will be a full-length live-action musical fantasy starring the underground dwellers who venture out into the human world. Henson Co. co-topper Lisa Henson is producing, whilst Brian Henson will exec produce."

In May 2008, The Weinstein Company announced it would distribute the Fraggle Rock movie. The film was written as a live-action musical by Cory Edwards, who would also direct. The film was to be produced by The Jim Henson Company; Ahmet Zappa was executive producing along with Brian Inerfeld. The film would involve all of the core characters from the series. The story would take the characters "outside of their home in Fraggle Rock, where they interact with humans, which they think are aliens." Karen Prell and Dave Goelz were slated to return for the film as Red Fraggle, Boober Fraggle, and Uncle Traveling Matt, respectively.

In 2011, Weinstein's deal with Henson expired, leaving the production of the film in doubt. The Scissor Sisters were announced to write music for the film. In October 2011, New Regency acquired the rights to the movie to be produced by The Jim Henson Company and The Montecito Picture Company, with 20th Century Fox distributing. New Regency and the producers were in discussion of whether to use puppets or CGI as well as a mix of live-action. Once this has been decided, it will look to a writer for the movie.

In 2012, James Byrkit and Alex Manugian were announced as screenwriters.

In March 2015, Variety said Joseph Gordon-Levitt would star in and produce the film. On July 28, 2018, Gordon-Levitt revealed that the film was still in early stages of development.

In December 2017, The Walt Disney Company (the current owners of The Muppets) announced that it would acquire 21st Century Fox, including 20th Century Fox. The acquisition was completed in March 2019, thus granting Disney the distribution rights to the film.

The feature film project was subsequently canceled in favor of a new television series.

=== Fraggle Rock: Rock On! ===
Fraggle Rock: Rock On! is a series of weekly live-action shorts, first broadcast on the Apple TV+ streaming service starting on April 21, 2020. Episodes follow the Fraggles living in separate caves during a period of social distancing, and interacting with each other using a video chat system that was installed by the Doozers. Footage for the series is shot using smartphones in the production teams' and artists' own homes. A total of six episodes have aired. Original cast members Karen Prell and Dave Goelz reprise their roles as Red Fraggle, and the voices of Boober Fraggle and Uncle Traveling Matt (they were puppeteered by John Tartaglia, who also performs Gobo Fraggle and puppeteers Wembley Fraggle). Other cast members include Donna Kimball as Mokey Fraggle and Frankie Cordero as the voice of Wembley.

=== Fraggle Rock: Back to the Rock ===
In January 2021, The Jim Henson Company announced that production officially started on a reboot of the show, titled Fraggle Rock: Back to the Rock. This new show is distinct from the Fraggle Rock: Rock On! shorts that were released in April 2020, and consists of full-length episodes. The show would be produced at the Calgary Film Centre. The series was released on January 21, 2022. Most of the cast from Fraggle Rock: Rock On returns for the series, with the exceptions of Wembley Fraggle, now performed by Jordan Lockhart, and Boober Fraggle and Uncle Traveling Matt, puppeteered by Frank Meschkuleit and Kevin Clash, respectively (Dave Goelz still provides their voices).

== Music ==
Music played a central part in Fraggle Rock. Every episode featured two or three original songs co-written by Canadian poet Dennis Lee and Philip Balsam, as well as incidental music. Several episodes (usually involving Cantus and the Minstrels) focused primarily on music—such as Red Fraggle's attempt to find "her song" for the Fraggle Medley, or the effect of music on the breaking of winter or the presence of light in Fraggle Rock.

During the show's original run, a re-recorded, extended version of its opening theme was released as a single that reached number 33 on the British chart in March 1984. Writers included Jim Henson, Jerry Juhl, and Jocelyn Stevenson, with songs by Philip Balsam and Dennis Lee.

=== Album releases ===
In 1983 through CBS Canada, MuppetMusic released Jim Henson's Muppets Present Fraggle Rock on both audiocassette & 12-inch vinyl disc, 17 songs with lyrics by Dennis Lee (one song by bpNichol) to music by Phil Balsam. the audiocassette version was reïssued in 1987

the following year, I.J.E.Incorporated (Hollywood, Florida) released Fraggle Rock Sing-Along Book Volume I, a pamphlet of illustrated lyrics to the 6 songs on a 7-inch vinyl disc or 20-minute audiocassette.

1984 saw the RCA rerelease of the domestic 1983 recordings internationally, first under the title Fraggle Rock (England), then, in a series of translations & rerecordings including Los Fraguel (Spain), Fragglerne (Sweden), Fragglit (Finland), Fragglene (Norway), & Fragglarna (Denmark); it is unknown just how many variants there are.

In 1993, a double CD of 21 further songs (none had appeared before on record), Jim Henson's Fraggle Rock Music and Magic, appeared from BMG Music.

KOCH Records released Fraggle Rockin': A Collection, a three-disc box set of Fraggle Rock music, on October 30, 2007. The collection featured "restored and remastered" versions of three original Fraggle Rock LPs. The collection also included "special liner notes featuring rarely seen photos, contributions from the original composers and even sheet music for select songs". The main portion of these liner notes, called "Getting Down at Fraggle Rock", features an interview with Philip Balsam and Lawrence S. Mirkin and is written by Mike Petersen and Saul Pincus.

In 2016, Enjoy The Toons Records added a further 7 songs to the 1983 collection, producing The Best Of Jim Henson's Fraggle Rock both as a picture disc & in a series of special issues on unique coloured vinyl.

=== Song list ===
Song list
- "Down In Fraggle Rock (Fraggle Rock Theme Song)"
- "Afraid to Be Afraid"
- "All Around the World"
- "Bad News"
- "Ball of Fire"
- "The Ballad of Sir Blunderbrain"
- "Beetle Song"
- "Brave Alone"
- "Brave Boy, Jump Up"
- "Bring Back the Wonder"
- "Catch the Tail by the Tiger"
- "Cave Flute"
- "Choose-Right (Up-Tight Move-Now) Blues"
- "The Clown Concerto"
- "Convincing John"
- "Count on Me"
- "Dixie Wailin’ "
- "Do It On My Own"
- "Doom Dee Doom (March Alone)"
- "Doozer Building Song (We'll Work Together Building Shapes in the Air)"
- "Doozer Gong Music"
- "Doozer Knitting Song"
- "Doozer March Song (Set Your Shoulder)"
- "Down in Fraggle Cave"
- "Dream Girl Lover"
- "Dream a Dream (and See)"
- "Dreaming of Someone"
- "Dum De Dum"
- "Dum De Dum II (I Wish I Had a Genie)"
- "Dum of a Son of a Gun"
- "Dump the Stuff Out (Yucky for Sure)"
- "Easy is the Only Way to Go"
- "Everybody's Doin' It"
- "Eye to Eye"
- "Face Facts, Pack Snacks, Make Tracks"
- "Feel So Bad"
- "The Fireman's Anthem"
- "Fly to the Sky (Learn to Fly)"
- "Follow Me"
- "Follow the Road"
- "Follow Your Heart"
- "Fraggle Rock Rock"
- "A Fraggle You Can't See"
- "Free and High"
- "Friends Till the End"
- "Friendship Song"
- "Front 'N' Back Patter Song (Turn Around Now!)"
- "The Garbage of Time"
- "Get Blue (Goin' Down the Road)"
- "Get Goin’ "
- "Go with the Flow"
- "Good-bye, Good-bye (Just a Rainbow in the Sky)"
- "The Gorg's Lament (O World O Time O Woe)"
- "The Gypsy Song (I Sniff the Rose)"
- "Help Me for a Change"
- "Helping Hand"
- "Here to There"
- "Hip Hip Hooray"
- "Ho Ho Ho (What a Funny World It Is)"
- "Home"
- "I Knew I Was Good"
- "I Seen Troubles"
- "I Swear (To Be Fair)"
- "I'm Never Alone"
- "I'm Not Scared"
- "I'm a Little Stew Pot"
- "If It Happened to You"
- "Inny Minny Cow Cow"
- "Is It True?"
- "The Joke Isn't Funny Anymore"
- "The Joy"
- "Just Don't Know What Time It Is"
- "Just a Little Wimp"
- "Kick a Stone"
- "Learn to Love a Wimp"
- "Let Me Be Your Song"
- "A Little Doozer Music"
- "Lose Your Heart (And It's Found)"
- "Lost and Found"
- "Lover, Lover, Number 9"
- "The Me I Wanna Be"
- "Magic Be with You" (The last song, appeared in the episode "Change of Address")
- "Mokey's Jam Session"
- "Muck and Goo" (written by bpNichol)
- "Music Box"
- "Music Makes Us Real (Ping!)"
- "Noodlin' Nut"
- "Now You See Me (Now You Don't)"
- "Now's the Time for Parting"
- "Once Upon a Time (I Knew My Name)"
- "One and One (I'm the One that Won!)"
- "Only Way Home"
- "Our Melody"
- "Pantry Chant"
- "Party Hard (Who Knows What You See)"
- "Pass It On"
- "(Today Has Been) A Perfect Day"
- "Perfect Harmony"
- "Pipe Bangers Theme"
- "Please/See/Feel the Water Run"
- "Pukka, Pukka, Pukka Squeetily Boink"
- "Ragtime Queen"
- "Recruiting Song (Heed the Drumbeat Now)"
- "Remembering Song (Na-Na-Na)"
- "Rev"
- "The Rock Goes On"
- "Rollin', Rollin' On"
- "The Rules Song (I'm the Leader Now)"
- "Rumble Bug Hum"
- "Sail Away"
- "Share and You're Not Alone"
- "Shine On Us Now (Moon Come Soon)"
- "Shine On, Shine On Me"
- "Sing It and Say"
- "Sing That Law Again"
- "(Sleep By the) Light of the Moon"
- "Sleeping and Dreaming"
- "Somewhere There's a Special Place"
- "Sorrow and Shame"
- "Spring Cleaning"
- "Stuff Samba"
- "Sunlight and Shadow"
- "Sweet, Sweet Little Treat"
- "There's a Lot I Want to Know"
- "Time to Live as One"
- "Trash is Back in Town"
- "Tree of Life"
- "Turn Your Buttons Down"
- "Voodoo Spell"
- "Water Drip Song"
- "The Way I've Got to Go"
- "Welcome Back, Uncle Matt"
- "Wembley, Wembley, Number 9"
- "Wemblin' Fool"
- "What If"
- "What If a Friend"
- "What an Awful Day"
- "Why?"
- "Wise to Myself"
- "Without a Hat"
- "Workin’ "
- "Yes, We Can"
- "Yucky!"
- "Closing Theme"

==== Soundtrack musicians ====
- Don Gillis — Musical Director
- Bernie LaBarge — Guitar
- Michael Francis — Guitar
- Bob McLaren — Drums
- Ray Parker — Keyboards
- Tom Szczesniak — Bass Guitar
- Dick Smith — Percussion

== In other media ==
=== Books ===
Interactive books produced for Playskool's Talk 'n Play:

- Fraggle Rock: The Great Fraggle Travel Race

Magic Pen and Invisible Inks books for Lee Publications

- Fraggle Rock (No title – the cover scene of Fraggles playing tag – artwork by Nate Butler) (1989)
- Fraggle Rock (No title – the cover scene of Fraggles looking into musical treasure chest – artwork by Nate Butler) (1989)
Books based on Fraggle Rock

Listed as: title, author, illustrator, and date of publication.

- The Radish Day Jubilee, Sheilah B. Bruce, Lawrence DiFiori 1983
- Red and the Pumpkins, Jocelyn Stevenson, Kelly Oechsli 1983
- They Call Me Boober Fraggle, Michaela Muntean, Lisa McCue 1983
- Wembley Fraggle Gets the Story, Deborah Perlberg, Steven Schindler 1984
- Gobo and the River, Joseph Killorin Brennan, Diane Dawson Hearn 1985
- Marooned in Fraggle Rock, David Young, Barbara McClintock
- Best Friends, Jocelyn Stevenson, Sue Venning 1984
- Boober Fraggle's Celery Soufflé, Louise Gikow, Kelly Oechsli 1984
- Danger: Boober Cooking, Louise Gikow, Kelly Oechsli 1984
- Boober Fraggle's Giant Wish, Jocelyn Stevenson, Jeffrey Severn 1984
- If I Were King of the Universe, Danny Abelson, Lawrence DiFiori 1984
- The Legend of the Doozer Who Didn't, Louise Gikow, Barbara McClintock 1984
- No One Knows Where Gobo Goes, Mark Saltzman, Peter Elwell 1984
- The Tale of Traveling Matt, Michaela Muntean, Lisa McCue 1984
- Traveling Matt's Adventures in Outer Space, Michaela Muntean, Lisa McCue 1984
- What Do Doozers Do?, Michaela Muntean, Sue Venning 1984
- What's a Fraggle?, Louise Gikow, Barbara McClintock 1984
- Wembley's Egg, Laura Phillips, Sue Venning 1984
- Fraggle Countdown, Michaela Muntean, Diane Dawson Hearn 1985
- The Cave of the Lost Fraggle, Michael Teitelbaum, Peter Elwell 1985
- Follow That Fraggle, Louise Gikow, Barbara Lanza 1985
- Sprocket, Dog Detective, Louise Gikow, Barbara Lanza 1985
- Mokey's Birthday Present, Ellen Weiss, Elizabeth Miles 1985
- Waggleby of Fraggle Rock, Stephanie Calmenson, Barbara McClintock 1985
- Why Wembley Fraggle Couldn't Sleep, H. B. Gilmour, Barbara McClintock 1985
- Goodnight Wembley Fraggle, H. B. Gilmour, Barbara McClintock 1985
- Cotterpin's Perfect Building, Ellen Weiss, Lauren Attinello 1986
- Wembley and the Soggy Map, Louise Gikow, Lisa McCue 1986
- Wembley Fraggle and the Magic Stone, Louise Gikow, Lauren Attinello 1986
- Gobo and the Prize from Outer Space, Lyn Calder, Frederic Marvin 1986
- The Case of the Missing Socks, Rebecca Grand, Jeffrey Severn 1986
- Wembley Fraggle's Big, Bigger, Biggest, Harry Ross, Larry DiFiori 1988
- The Fraggles Alphabet Pie, Harry Ross, Larry DiFiori 1988
- The Fraggles Counting Book, Harry Ross, Larry DiFiori 1988
- Mokey Fraggle's New Colors, Emily Paul, Larry DiFiori 1988
- The Fraggles Cooperate, Harry Ross, Larry DiFiori 1989

=== Comics ===
The Star Comics imprint of Marvel Comics published two separate Fraggle Rock comic-book series in 1985 and 1988 respectively. Originally, the first series was to be drawn by Marty Taras, the creator of Baby Huey, and the cover of the first published issue of the Fraggle Rock comic is done by him. Also, at least one penciled page of his Fraggle work for that first issue has been preserved in print. However the art assignment for the series finally went to Marie Severin, who illustrated all eight-issue interiors and the other seven covers. The second series lasted six issues.

In early 2010, Archaia Studios Press published its first three-issue series of Fraggle Rock. A second three-issue series was followed in January 2011. Both series were collected into hardcover editions shortly after their respective publications. A four-issue miniseries Fraggle Rock: Journey to the Everspring was published in 2014. A third three-issue miniseries was published in 2018.

=== Other televised appearances ===
- Before its background appearance on Fraggle Rock, Food (a small, brown, alien creature) first appeared on Saturday Night Live during "The Land of Gorch" sketch. It was later recycled as Zsa Zsa Porkmustard in the "Science Fiction" episode of The Jim Henson Hour as well as an undersea creature cameo in the "Aquatic Life" episode.
- Uncle Traveling Matt appears in The Muppets Take Manhattan, seated in Piggy's wedding party during the play where he is in the same section as the bears that Fozzie Bear was hibernating with.
- There was a special featuring the Fraggles called Fraggles Look for Jobs which details the Fraggles after the show had ended. Gobo has secured a singing job billed as "Gobo the Frosty Fraggle", Wembley has no immediate plans except to stop wearing banana tree shirts, Mokey is writing a screenplay called "Girls of the Sixties", and Red has signed a contract to play hockey for the Toronto Maple Leafs. Boober spends most of the video on the phone (with Bernie and others) hoping to find another acting job, preferably as a romantic lead. Two clips from this have been shown on The Jim Henson Company's YouTube page.
- A prototype version of Blustering Bellowpane Monster appeared in the Play-Along Video film Neat Stuff: To Know & To Do as Mergie (performed by Camille Bonora).
- Mama Tree Bird and Baby Tree Bird appeared in The Ghost of Faffner Hall.
- The Rumble Bugs made background cameos in The Song of the Cloud Forest.
- Gobo Fraggle, Mokey Fraggle, and Wembley Fraggle made a cameo appearance in The Muppets Celebrate Jim Henson alongside the other Muppets and characters from Sesame Street in the "Just One Person" tribute song to Jim Henson.
- The puppets for Sprocket the Dog, Begoony, Mudwell the Mudbunny, Murray the Minstrel, Aretha, Wander McMooch, Brool the Minstrel, and the Inkspots make cameo appearances in The Muppet Christmas Carol. Begooney was shown as the child of the characters depicted by Mudwell and Murray. Sprocket was seen in a crowd cameo. The Inkspots (performed by Jerry Nelson and Steve Whitmire) were seen in the house windows and one of them was seen near a mud puddle during the song "Scrooge" while sitting next to the Porcupine from Billy Bunny's Animal Songs. Aretha (performed by Karen Prell) appears in a crowd chorus where she has a line in the song with a Pig Businessman and the Blue Frackle. Wander McMooch (performed by David Rudman) and Brool the Minstrel (performed by Louise Gold) make cameo appearances as one of the guests at Fred's party.
- Mudwell the Mudbunny, Begoony, Murray the Minstrel, Brool the Minstrel, Wander McMooch, Inkspots, Aretha, Baby Tree Creature, Mama Tree Creature, Papa Tree Creature and Blustering Bellowpane Monster appears in Muppet Classic Theater.
- The Sneels, where they've appeared in the caves eating plants in Gunge the Great and the Glorious, as well as several posters, returned in The Wubbulous World of Dr. Seuss with a Seuss style (performed by the puppeteer who voiced "Mokey", the pink Sneel, and Stephanie D' Abruzzo, the Green one). Their babies, who never surfaced anywhere in the caves of Fraggle Rock, made their debut on this show.
- Large Marvin Fraggle (though one of the only Fraggles to appear on the mainstream The Muppets series), Blustering Bellowpane Monster, Begooney, Brool the Minstrel, Inkspots, Mudwell the Mudbunny, Murray the Minstrel, and Poison Cackler appear in Muppets Tonight.
- The puppets for Philo, Begoony, Blustering Bellowpane Monster, The Inkspots, Murray the Minstrel, Beastie, Mudwell the Mudbunny, Brool the Minstrel, Aretha, and an unnamed background cave creature appeared in Mopatop's Shop as various guests.
- Aretha appears in The Muppets' Wizard of Oz as a Flying Monkey.
- Blustering Bellowpane Monster appears in The Muppets. It can be seen in a Muppet crowd cameo near the end of the film.
- Blustering Bellowpane Monster appears in Muppets Most Wanted. He is seen in the opening of "El Muppet Show" and "The Wedding".

=== Live appearances ===
- Starting in 2008, Karen Prell began making live appearances with a rebuilt Red Fraggle puppet at various events like San Diego Comic-Con.
- Wembley Fraggle, Red Fraggle, and Uncle Traveling Matt appeared in the "Fraggle Rock" portion of the Jim Henson's Musical World show at Carnegie Hall in 2012.
- On April 24, 2013, Red Fraggle and Gobo Fraggle appeared at "The Spare Room" to commemorate the 30th Anniversary of Fraggle Rock. Karen Prell performed Red as usual while John Tartaglia performed Gobo.
- In May 2013, John Tartaglia performed Gobo Fraggle at an event to grant the Museum of the Moving Image a permanent gallery devoted to Jim Henson.
- Kathryn Mullen and Karen Prell performed Mokey Fraggle and Red Fraggle at Dragon Con 2013 as part of Fraggle Rock's 30th Anniversary during the "Fraggle Rock Meet and Greet" event. Michael K. Frith also attended with puppeteers Paul McGinnis and Victor Yerrid.
- On September 24, 2016, Red, Gobo, Wembley, and Mokey appeared at a Puppets for Puppetry event honoring Muppet performer Dave Goelz. Karen Prell and John Tartaglia performed Red and Gobo as usual, while Kevin Clash performed Wembley and Donna Kimball performed Mokey.

=== Internet appearances ===
- Gobo Fraggle, Wembley Fraggle, Boober Fraggle, Mokey Fraggle, Red Fraggle, and Uncle Traveling Matt appear in the music video for the Ben Folds Five song "Do It Anyway", for which Chris Hardwick and Lisa Henson served as executive producers. Only Red, Boober, and Uncle Traveling Matt have a dialogue. While Karen Prell and Dave Goelz reprised their roles of Red Fraggle and Uncle Traveling Matt, the other puppeteers included Sean Johnson as Boober Fraggle, Patrick Johnson as Wembley Fraggle, and Donna Kimball as Mokey Fraggle.
