= List of Fraggle Rock episodes =

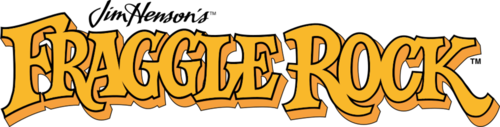

Fraggle Rock is a children's musical fantasy comedy television series created by Jim Henson. Episode descriptions are listed below for the original English-language North American version of the program broadcast by CBC and HBO. Consequently, the other versions made for FR3 in France, ITV in the UK and ZDF in Germany may not correlate with the details listed below.

== Series overview ==
Season	Episodes	Originally released	
Season	Episodes	First released	Last released
1	24	January 10, 1983	July 4, 1983
2	24	January 2, 1984	June 11, 1984
3	22	December 24, 1984	May 27, 1985
4	13	January 6, 1986	March 31, 1986
5	13	January 5, 1987	March 30, 1987

== Episodes ==
=== Season 1 (1983) ===
No. overall	No. in season	Title	Directed by	Written by	Original release date	Prod. code
1	1	"Beginnings"	Jim Henson	Jerry Juhl	January 10, 1983	110
Doc moves into his new workshop and finds a hole in the wall, which—unknown to him—connects Fraggle Rock and the outside world. Uncle Traveling Matt sets out to explore "Outer Space", giving Gobo the job of collecting the postcards he sends back describing his discoveries. After some deliberation, Gobo accepts responsibility for his new social role.
2	2	"Wembley and the Gorgs"	Jim Henson	Jerry Juhl	January 17, 1983	108
Boober's lucky walking stick gets broken, and Gobo and Wembley set out to the Gorg's Garden to get a new one. When Wembley gets caught by the Gorgs, he thinks he has found a great new place to be; that is, until Gobo, Mokey, Boober, and Red get caught as well, and Wembley finds out who his real friends are.
3	3	"Let the Water Run"	Perry Rosemond	Jocelyn Stevenson	January 24, 1983	105
Red is getting ready for her swim meet and is doing all the preparations by herself, even when her friends ask if they can help. But when the water runs dry in the Fraggle Pond and the Pipe-Bangers can not seem to bring it back, she gets worried. Gobo tells her of something called an umbrella, an apparent water-summoning tool Uncle Traveling Matt found during his adventures. Red decides to go into "outer space" and get one herself, but when she gets too scared, she finally asks someone for help.
4	4	"You Can't Do That Without a Hat"	Perry Rosemond	Jocelyn Stevenson	January 31, 1983	103
When everyone gets tired of Boober being so afraid, Red takes him to the Trash Heap, who tells him the key to bravery is to always wear his hat. Boober's bravery is cut short when his hat is blown off his head, and he is stuck being scared again. But when Gobo finds the hat on a Doozer lost in the Gorgs' Garden, Boober saves Gobo from being thumped by Junior.
5	5	"The Thirty-Minute Work Week"	Norman Campbell	Jerry Juhl	February 7, 1983	101
Gobo gets postcards, Mokey collects radishes, Boober does laundry, and Red cleans the Fraggle Pond as she swims. Now it's time for Wembley to get a job, but Wembley just can not seem to find what he wants to do, until he hears about the Volunteer Fire Department. Highlight: Dave Goelz, the Muppeteer who performs Uncle Traveling Matt, makes a cameo appearance in Matt's scene. When Matt boards a roller coaster, Goelz is sitting next to him, performing Matt. Goelz has a false arm on the back of the roller coaster. The scene was filmed at Canada's Wonderland, a theme park in Maple, Ontario, just north of filming headquarters in Metropolitan Toronto. The park was relatively new, having opened in 1981; Wilde Beast was one of the original rides at the park.
6	6	"The Preachification of Convincing John"	Jim Henson	Jerry Juhl	February 14, 1983	104
Mokey decides that it is not proper for Fraggles to eat the constructions Doozers work so hard to build. To convince the other Fraggles that she is right, she gets the help of a charismatic Fraggle known as Convincing John. But when the towers cramp up the caves and the Doozers become unhappy, Mokey realizes her mistake.
7	7	"I Want to Be You"	Perry Rosemond	Jocelyn Stevenson	February 21, 1983	107
Red wishes her talents were as appreciated as Mokey's, so she decides to live just like her. When she tries to collect radishes like Mokey, she gets two of her friends caught in a Gorg trap. Maybe just being yourself is not so bad, after all.
8	8	"The Terrible Tunnel"	George Bloomfield	Jocelyn Stevenson	February 28, 1983	111
Boober has been imparting his various superstitions onto the impressionable Wembley, much to Gobo's annoyance. Boober tells Wembley of a deadly tunnel hidden somewhere in Fraggle Rock, and when the gang goes to the Storyteller, she tells the tale of the Terrible Tunnel at Wembley's request. Later on, during a game of "Hidey-Ho", Wembley accidentally finds the Terrible Tunnel. When he gets back and tells everyone, no one but Boober believes him. Wembley gets Gobo and Red to go back with him and see the truth: the tunnel is very real.
9	9	"The Lost Treasure of the Fraggles"	Perry Rosemond	Jerry Juhl	March 7, 1983	109
Gobo and Red find a treasure map leading to the Lost Treasure of the Fraggles. Unfortunately, it is located in the Gorgs' castle, so they get Wembley, Mokey, and Boober to help. Instead of riches, the treasure is something even more valuable.
10	10	"Don't Cry Over Spilt Milk"	Perry Rosemond	Jerry Juhl	March 14, 1983	102
Doc boards up the hole in the workshop wall, leaving Gobo trapped in the workshop to fend for himself against Sprocket. Meanwhile, Red and Wembley seek out the Trash Heap's advice on how to rescue him, and Mokey and Boober discover a Doozer catapult. The four put their heads together to save their friend.
11	11	"Catch the Tail by the Tiger"	Jim Henson	David Young	March 21, 1983	106
Uncle Traveling Matt has not sent a postcard in two weeks, and Gobo worries he'll have to go looking for him. Gobo struggles between following his duties and listening to his instincts.
12	12	"The Finger of Light"	Peter Harris	David Young	March 28, 1983	112
When Mokey is picked by the mysterious "finger of light" to be "Ruler of the Rock" for a day, the weight of leadership is heavy on her shoulders. She has the chance to give three commands, and when her first two go wrong, she ponders on what she can do for the betterment of the Rock. Doc decides to use music to help his plants grow.
13	13	"We Love You, Wembley"	Jim Henson	Jocelyn Stevenson	April 4, 1983	113
Everyone wants Wembley to do something for them, and Wembley just cannot say no. But when a Fraggle girl named Lou wants to do something for him, he starts to see that his needs are just as important. Mokey believes that Wembley's new friendship with Lou is the start of romance, and she takes him to the Trash Heap for advice, despite his protests. Doc tries to turn an old chandelier into a bizarre alarm clock emergency alert system for EAS. Highlight: The Muppet look of Gobo has changed in this episode and would remain this way for the rest of the series, as he was redesigned during the six-month break between the end of filming on the first half of season 1 in August 1982, and the beginning of filming for the second half in February 1983. The shape of Gobo's face is altered, he was given eyelids, a haircut, and he also has a new shirt and vest.
14	14	"The Challenge"	George Bloomfield	Jerry Juhl	April 11, 1983	114
Red is tired of Gobo being the leader of their friend group, so when she tries to take Gobo and Boober to the Trash Heap and they instead get caught by Pa Gorg, it's up to Gobo and Red to work together to get themselves back home. Doc buys a computer and challenges Sprocket to a video game.
15	15	"I Don't Care"	Stephen Katz	Carol Bolt	April 18, 1983	115
Boober becomes increasingly angry when everyone shows disrespect for his feelings—and his lucky blanket. Doc invents a robotic dog to fetch his newspaper for him, striking jealousy in Sprocket.
16	16	"Capture the Moon"	Doug Williams	David Brandes	April 25, 1983	116
It's the Festival of the Moon, and Gobo is chosen to do something special for the ceremony. When the moon disappears from the Fraggle pond and the Fraggles blame Junior, Gobo, Wembley, and Mokey sneak into the Gorgs' castle to retrieve it.
17	17	"Marooned"	George Bloomfield	David Young	May 2, 1983	117
No two Fraggles could be more different from each other than Red and Boober. But when Boober and Red get trapped in a cave-in on Boober's birthday, they end up finding out they're more alike than they originally thought.
18	18	"The Minstrels"	Jim Henson	Jocelyn Stevenson	May 9, 1983	118
A group of wandering minstrels, led by a man named Cantus, arrive in Fraggle Rock and tell the Fraggles to find their respective songs so that they can sing a medley together. Red volunteers to take charge of the medley, but she cannot find her song, so she "borrows" Cantus's magic pipe for some inspiration. The pipe drags her out into the Gorgs' Garden, and she and Mokey narrowly escape being thumped by Junior. Red returns the pipe to Cantus and finds her song without its magic.
19	19	"The Great Radish Famine"	George Bloomfield	Jerry Juhl	May 16, 1983	119
Knowing the Fraggles, Doozers, and Gorgs all need radishes to survive, the Trash Heap hides the radishes from the Gorgs' garden to get the creatures to cooperate; unfortunately, all they can do is blame each other. Mokey visits the Trash Heap for advice and is told to meet a Gorg and a Doozer in the Gorgs' garden at midnight. The Trash Heap's plan doesn't go as she expected, but in the end the radishes are returned.
20	20	"The Garden Plot"	George Bloomfield	B.P. Nichol	May 23, 1983	120
Red heads to the Gorg's garden to steal a radish to prove to Gobo that she is not afraid. She learns that Junior wants to get rid of Fraggle Rock, and Mokey and Wembley find out that Sprocket is trying to break in through the hole in the workshop wall. Gobo entrusts Red to keep Junior at bay, and her quick thinking saves Fraggle Rock from destruction.
21	21	"Gobo's Discovery"	Martin Lavut	Jocelyn Stevenson	May 30, 1983	121
Gobo cannot decide if he really wants to be an explorer like his uncle, Traveling Matt. When he thinks Wembley and Boober have gotten lost in the Great Outer Maze, he sets out to rescue them. Wembley and Boober return, but Gobo accidentally disturbs the Maze's dangerous Invisible Garboil. It's up to him to create a plan to get the Garboil away from Fraggle Rock, and the experience leads him to an important realization.
22	22	"Mokey's Funeral"	Jim Henson	Jerry & Susan Juhl	June 6, 1983	123
Everyone thinks Mokey is only good at art and can't do anything practical. She discovers that Junior has set a trap preventing her from gathering radishes, and she realizes she has the opportunity to prove her friends wrong. She creates a dummy Fraggle out of rags to set off the trap, but the dummy's uncanny likeness to Mokey results in a tragic misunderstanding among both her friends and the Gorgs.
23	23	"The Beast of Bluerock"	George Bloomfield	Sugith Varughese	June 13, 1983	122
Red's having a Splashathon, and Gobo wants everyone to go with him to explore Bluerock. Since they can only do one or the other, Wembley ends up being the deciding vote. After he reluctantly chooses to stay with Red, Gobo gets upset with Wembley's 'wembling' and decides to go to Bluerock by himself. But when Wembley sees Gobo has forgotten his pickaxe, he goes off to Bluerock to give it to him. Wembley and Gobo may be the first Fraggles to ever explore Bluerock... if they can get over their fears first.
24	24	"The New Trash Heap in Town"	George Bloomfield	Laura Phillips	July 4, 1983	124
When Gobo's leg is broken from a thumping by Junior Gorg, the Fraggles become too scared to sneak through the garden to get to the Trash Heap. The Trash Heap appears to the Fraggles in their dreams and tells them to look for wisdom within themselves. The Fraggles misinterpret her message and elect Mokey to be their new "Trash Heap." At first, she is helpful, but Gobo knows that this isn't the way things are supposed to be. He convinces Mokey that it was all a misunderstanding, and the two come up with a plan to make things right.

=== Season 2 (1984) ===
No. overall	No. in season	Title	Directed by	Written by	Original release date	Prod. code
25	1	"Wembley's Egg"	George Bloomfield	Laura Phillips	January 2, 1984	201
Wembley feels he has no purpose. But when Junior irritates some birds in the garden, an egg falls out of their nest and into the Fraggle Pond. Wembley decides to take care of the egg until it hatches, despite everyone else giving him a hard time. When the egg does hatch, the tree creature thinks Wembley's the 'mom'. So Wembley decides to be the 'mother' until the creature causes some problems in the Rock, and Wembley's forced to give him back to his parents out in the garden.
26	2	"Boober Rock"	Norman Campbell	B.P. Nichol	January 9, 1984	202
Boober Fraggle can not stand the noise people create every day. So when he hears from Gobo about the Caves of Boredom, he decides to move there. But when the Storyteller tells everyone about plants that make you forget that are in the Caves of Boredom, it's up to Boober's friends to get him out of there.
27	3	"The Trash Heap Doesn't Live Here Anymore"	George Bloomfield	Jerry Juhl	January 16, 1984	203
Wembley and Boober are having an ordinary day together, when Philo and Gunge show up in the Rock to tell them that the Gorgs are going to get rid of the Trash Heap once and for all. They save Marjorie in time to not lose wisdom forever.
28	4	"Red's Sea Monster"	Terry Maskell	David Young	January 23, 1984	204
Red gets upset when everyone thinks she's making up her record of holding her breath under water, so when she wanders off from the group, she discovers a sea monster that claims to be the last of the Lilly Creatures. When she tells everyone else, nobody believes her, except Marlon Fraggle, the oddest Fraggle in the Rock. Red's willing to do anything to prove herself to her friends, and having Marlon's help is the best way to do so.
29	5	"Uncle Matt Comes Home"	Eric Till	Jerry & Susan Juhl	January 30, 1984	206
Gobo finds out that Uncle Matt's coming back. But the reunion is not so sweet, and when the two of them along with Wembley decide to go and find Crystal Cavern they fight all along the way, losing Wembley, who finds Crystal Cavern and helps them figure out they're both good explorers, it's just that they're better at it when they do it alone.
30	6	"Boober's Dream"	George Bloomfield	Jocelyn Stevenson	February 6, 1984	205
Boober's been having terrible dreams about a very fun, happy Fraggle named Sidebottom who's trying to get Boober to have a little fun. So when he shares his dream with his friends, they have loads of fun with Sidebottom until a game of Fraggle Freeze causes a very big problem. Highlight: Traveling Matt sees a clip of The Dark Crystal at a drive-in.
31	7	"Mokey and the Minstrels"	George Bloomfield	Jocelyn Stevenson	February 13, 1984	207
Cantus and the Minstrels show up again, and when Cantus overhears Mokey's singing and tells her that she heard a 'ping' she thinks she's destined to be a Minstrel. But when she leaves her friends to find her calling, she discovers whether or not she has what it takes to join Cantus and his crew.
32	8	"All Work and All Play"	Jim Henson	Jerry Juhl	February 20, 1984	208
Cotterpin Doozer is quite different from the rest of the Doozers; she HATES to build, and would much rather become a Fraggle. So when she leaves in the middle of receiving her Doozer helmet to go hang out with Red Fraggle- the funnest Fraggle of all- she finds out that she's not quite cut out to be a Fraggle. But she is not cut out to build, either.
33	9	"Sir Hubris and the Gorgs"	George Bloomfield	Sugith Varughese	February 27, 1984	209
Gobo decides to go exploring, and when he finds a hole that leads to the inside of the Gorg's castle, he overhears Ma telling Junior about Sir Hubris. After hearing this, Gobo gets his other four friends to put on a cloak, stand on each other, and fool the Gorgs into leaving. But when Gobo and Red see Junior taking all the radishes, and hear Pa tell Junior to throw the Trash Heap into the well, the plan backfires, leaving Gobo no choice but to find a way to make the Gorgs stay.
34	10	"A Friend in Need"	Jim Henson	Laura Phillips	March 5, 1984	212
Gobo's been feeling pretty brave lately, and when he decides to go get his postcard from Uncle Matt late one night, Sprocket ends up trying to get through the hole to Fraggle Rock, and gets stuck. Gobo, being as brave as he is, decides he's going to get the Hairy Monster unstuck. He goes to the Gorg's Garden to get some greaseberry leaves, but gets caught in one of Junior's traps, leaving Gobo to realize he is not as unstoppable as he thought. He convinces a Gorg to let him out, and frees the Hairy Monster.
35	11	"The Wizard of Fraggle Rock"	Norman Campbell	Jocelyn Stevenson and John Pattison	March 12, 1984	210
It's Trophy Day in the Rock, and Wembley's upset because the only trophy he gets is one for "Best T-Shirt With Banana Trees On It." But when the Wizard of Fraggle Rock shows up, who looks an awful lot like Wembley, the Wizard asks if Wembley would like to trade places. Wembley has a lot of fun with it at first, but when he finds out that the Wizard is being chased by a Poison Cackler, Wembley's stuck in a bind, and must find a way to get rid of him before it's too late.
36	12	"The Doozer Contest"	George Bloomfield	Sugith Varughese	March 19, 1984	211
Flange and Modem Doozer have been trying new ideas for their building material; Flange added tomato extract (ketchup), and Modem added mustard powder. When they observe the Fraggles enjoying their constructions and say they enjoy the mustard best, Modem takes credit for her part, saying that the mustard is what made it good. Flange gets upset, and before long, the two are fighting and they have a contest to see whose is better. In order to find out, they have to find a truly decisive Fraggle to judge. Wembley is their answer.
37	13	"Red's Club"	Eric Till	Jocelyn Stevenson	March 26, 1984	213
When Red gets tired of everyone doing what Gobo wants to do, she starts a club. But when everyone else elects Gobo to be the High Helper- the leader of the Helping Club- Red gets angry and decides to form a club that will rival Gobo's. When Red's only member, Cotterpin Doozer, leaves because she's tired of Red's bossiness, she decides to help Pa Gorg get Ma's hanky out of the well. But when Gobo hears from Cotterpin that Red's in the Gorg's Garden, he takes Boober, Mokey and Wembley with him to save her, but they end up being caught too. Red puts her selfishness aside to save her friends before it's too late.
38	14	"The Secret of Convincing John"	George Bloomfield	B.P. Nichol	April 2, 1984	214
After Wembley’s indecisive nature nearly gets Gobo seriously injured, he decides that Convincing John is the only Fraggle in the Rock to get him to be more decisive. But when Wembley changes his name to Wilfred and decides to take on everyone else's jobs, he becomes a bit of a problem, and it's up to Convincing John- the most indecisive Fraggle ever- to change him back to normal.
39	15	"Manny's Land of Carpets"	Eric Till	David Young	April 9, 1984	215
When Gobo finds a radio by the hole to "Outer Space" he brings it back to the Rock, where the Fraggles mistake radio advertisements for heavenly places to eat, sleep and live. But when other Fraggles decide they'd rather go to other places than just Manny's Land of Carpets, Gobo sees that, if they leave, they'd be saying goodbye to Fraggle Rock for good.
40	16	"Junior Sells the Farm"	George Bloomfield	Jerry Juhl	April 16, 1984	216
After catching Mokey and Red in a trap, Junior hears from his parents that he needs to grow up and find a bride, and to do that, he'd need some Peas of Power. When Ma and Pa go for an afternoon walk, Wander McMooch- a nasty, swindling toad- comes along and decides he wants the castle. After conning Junior into giving him the castle for a bag of regular peas (instead of the actual Peas of Power), Junior realizes, with the help of Mokey, that he needs to work with what he's got in order to get the castle back.
41	17	"Fraggle Wars"	George Bloomfield	Laura Phillips	April 23, 1984	218
Red and Mokey have gone off camping together, and one morning, Mokey wakes up early and hears a strange kind of singing. She discovers unfun Fraggles who blindfold her and put her in a cage. Red ends up finding Mokey and goes back to get help to free her. The World's Oldest Fraggle then leads an attack force against the "Other" Fraggles and declares war, something Fraggles have not done in a very, very long time. It's up to Red to communicate with the "Other" Fraggles before the war actually begins.
42	18	"The Day the Music Died"	Eric Till	B.P. Nichol	April 30, 1984	217
The Storyteller has chosen Gobo to write the Glory Song this year. Gobo's wanting some peace and quiet, asking all Fraggles to stop singing. But what he doesn't know is, singing is what keeps the Ditsies- the tiny creatures who support light in Fraggle Rock- from dying. So when the lights go out all over Fraggle Rock, Gobo must find a way to get the light going again, and when he does, he just might be able to write the perfect Glory Song.
43	19	"The Doomsday Soup"	Jim Henson	Sugith Varughese	May 7, 1984	219
When Boober accidentally mixes bad-tasting routabega gumbo with his ruined laundry, he finds out that he's created something that can make anything invisible. So when he shares it with his other friends, they decide to cover themselves in it and go to the Gorg's Garden and get radishes. However, the magic soup becomes a problem when rock quakes shake up Fraggle Rock. Boober thinks the soup is nothing but trouble, he has to find a way to get rid of the soup before anyone gets hurt.
44	20	"A Cave of One's Own"	George Bloomfield	Jerry & Susan Juhl	May 14, 1984	220
Gobo and Wembley are tired of Mokey and Red always being in their room, so the girls go off together to find their own place. At first the living situation seems to be okay, but as time goes by, Mokey and Red just keep getting on each other's nerves more and more, until there's a huge fight. They consider finding different places to live, then find a way to sort things out and still live together.
45	21	"Wembley and the Great Race"	George Bloomfield	Robert Sandler	May 21, 1984	222
Since Red recently broke her tail, it looks like Wembley and Gobo will have to compete against each other in a race. When Wembley actually wins the first time, Gobo, who hates losing, thinks he was lucky and wants to race again. When they do, Wembley loses on purpose because he doesn't want Gobo to be upset. This only gets Gobo angry and he makes Wembley race one last time, this time fairly. But Wembley gets tired of being put in the middle of Red and Gobo, lets them know how he feels, and when he does the race this time, he's only going to do it for himself.
46	22	"Doozer Is As Doozer Does"	Eric Till	Jocelyn Stevenson	May 28, 1984	223
"Flooping" is a term the Doozers use for jumping up and down. And when they do this, they get hiccups, which is a very dangerous thing for Doozers. However, when Wrench sees some other 'cool' Doozers "flooping" on the job, he decides to do it too, but when his new friends get in serious trouble, Wrench has second thoughts.
47	23	"Boober's Quiet Day"	Eric Till	Jerry Juhl	June 4, 1984	221
Boober's just trying to have a nice, quiet day. But when Mokey, Tosh, Red and Gobo keep interrupting him, he lets Sidebottom out to help him lie to his friends and keep them away. However, when he hears that the Gypsy Lady is coming, he tells everyone he's offered his cave to her when she arrives, and then dresses up and pretends to be like her in front of everyone. But when the real Gypsy Lady appears, Boober's forced to tell the truth.
48	24	"The Invasion of the Toe Ticklers"	George Bloomfield	David Young	June 11, 1984	224
Mokey's out past the Gorg's Garden writing in her diary when she comes across Agnus, a Toe Tickler. She decides to bring her back to the Rock when she overhears Ma tell Junior to kill the Toe Ticklers. But Mokey ends up having a big problem on her hands when all of the Toe Ticklers follow her into Fraggle Rock. Gobo, Boober, Wembley and Red put all the Toe Ticklers in Chimney Hole Cavern, against Mokey's wishes. Mokey goes inside to find Agnus, only to find that all of the Toe Ticklers are in cocoons, and when they hatch, they become Purple Sproingers.

=== Season 3 (1984–85) ===
No. overall	No. in season	Title	Directed by	Written by	Original release date	Prod. code
49	1	"The Bells of Fraggle Rock"	Doug Williams	Jerry & Susan Juhl and Jocelyn Stevenson	December 24, 1984	305
It's winter time in Fraggle Rock, and Cantus arrives to help the Fraggles celebrate the Festival of the Bells. However, Gobo's holiday spirits aren't up and he's forgotten the true meaning. So to make this holiday extra special, he decides he's going to find the Great Bell of Fraggle Rock and bring it back before the celebration begins. But the Rock grows colder, and as Red, Mokey, Boober and Wembley wait, they grow closer to becoming frozen. Cantus goes to find Gobo and bring him back, but Gobo's still wanting to bring the Great Bell back. Will he be able to bring the bell back before his friends freeze? Or will he finally understand the true importance of the Festival of the Bells?
50	2	"Red-Handed and the Invisible Thief"	Terry Maskell	Robert Sandler	January 7, 1985	301
Red absolutely loves her radish bars (which are the equivalent of Pop-Tarts in our world). So when she sees that whenever she wakes up from sleeping that her bars are missing, she sets out to find the crook, which leads her to think her roommate Mokey stole them. She also gets Gobo to hide in a hole outside her room to watch and see if it really is Mokey; after Gobo gets distracted from reading a postcard, the bars go missing again, but Gobo claims he didn't see anything. So finally she gets Wembley to stay the night with her to catch the thief, and what Wembley finds ends up being quite surprising.
51	3	"Boober and the Glob"	Jim Henson	Jocelyn Stevenson	January 14, 1985	307
It's Joke Day in Fraggle Rock, and Boober's trying to get out before his friends find him and make him participate in the holiday he hates. But before he leaves, a huge purplish-pink glob rolls into the Great Hall. Boober ends up meeting Cotterpin Doozer as well, and the Doozers are on their way to start building near the Blob. However, the Glob starts to eat the Doozers, one by one, and soon enough, Cotterpin's inside the Glob too. Even though a part of Boober really just wants to run away and pretend it isn't happening, he's forced into action and must find a way to set the Doozers free.
52	4	"The Grapes of Generosity"	Terry Maskell	Jerry Juhl	January 21, 1985	308
Gobo finds the legendary "Grapes of Generosity", mystical fruits which are rumored to compel anyone who eats them to share them with others. However, when Gobo brings them back, he ends up eating them and keeping them all to himself. Before long, Gobo becomes weightless, and tries to hide it from everyone else. But when he hears that Red climbed to the very top of the Great Hall, it's up to him to get Red down safely, and finally admit to everyone that his own problem was caused by being greedy.
53	5	"Blanket of Snow, Blanket of Woe"	George Bloomfield	B.P. Nichol	January 28, 1985	306
Mokey's been making too many promises lately; most notably, she was supposed to knit a tarpaulin for the Trash Heap before the next big snow. But she ends up being too late, and when she sees Philo and Gunge mourning over the frozen Marjorie, she decides she has to fix her mistake. When she overhears the Gorgs need to throw out some yucky, hot soup, she along with the help of Gobo go into the Gorg's castle to find a way to get the soup on the Trash Heap so she can thaw out.
54	6	"Pebble Pox Blues"	George Bloomfield	Laura Phillips	February 4, 1985	304
Gobo's come down with the Pebble Pox, so it's up to Boober and Wembley to go to the Cave of Shadows to get Gobo's cure. However, Boober's not too fond of the idea, and shares his worries with Wembley along the way. Before long, Wembley comes up with a bad case of the Pebble Pox, too. Will Boober leave his sick friend behind and ditch the journey, or will Boober put his germ-worries aside to help his friends?
55	7	"Home Is Where the Trash Is"	George Bloomfield	Sugith Varughese	February 11, 1985	302
Philo and Gunge are sick and tired of being around Marjorie, so they decide to go off and find their home. The only problem is, they don't know where they originally came from. After a failed attempt to live in Mokey and Red's room, they travel far away, were caught and made slaves of Wander McMooch, the Trash Heap's biggest enemy. When the Fraggle Five see that Marjorie is becoming weak without her rodent duo, it's up to Gobo, Mokey, Wembley, Boober and Red to save Philo and Gunge from McMooch before it's too late.
56	8	"Believe It or Not"	Terry Maskell	Jocelyn Stevenson	February 18, 1985	303
Red and Wembley decide they're going on an adventure out in the Gorg's Garden today. At the same time, Ma is trying to get Pa and Junior to clean the basement, which is something that they really don't want to do. Junior catches a fluffy little creature named Skinfrith, and then Red and Wembley set him free so they can have some fun. But what they don't know is, this Skinfrith is a magical creature that can change into anything that someone can imagine. And before long, Skinfrith gets into the Gorgs' basement, and Ma thinks there's a terrible beast inside, which is what Skinfred turns into. Wembley and Red sneak in to save their new friend, but they need to convince Ma Gorg, who's trapped in the basement with them, that Skinfrith isn't all as bad as he seems.
57	9	"Wembley and the Mean Genie"	Doug Williams	Robert Sandler	February 25, 1985	310
When Gobo, Red and Wembley are searching for unique items, Wembley comes upon an old green bottle. He takes it back to his cave, and while he's polishing the bottle up, a genie appears. Wembley can hardly believe his luck, but this genie has his own agenda. He destroys all the items Gobo and Red found, then he scares Boober half to death by making his laundry look like ghosts. Gobo says he needs to get rid of the mean genie, but the genie says he needs to stop letting Gobo boss him around. Later on, Wembley decides Gobo was right, and they create a plan to get the genie back in the bottle, then bury it. The plan works, but Wembley feels sorry for the genie, and lets him out. Later on, when Gobo's trying to show everyone the bottle, he accidentally breaks it, but Wembley confesses he let him out. The genie shows up again, and turns all the Fraggles into something that looks like a Fraggle army. It's up to Wembley to stick up for himself to make things right again.
58	10	"The Secret Society of Poohbahs"	George Bloomfield	Jerry Juhl	March 4, 1985	312
Mokey really, really wants to be a part of the Secret Society of Poohbahs, even though Red keeps telling her it's just a silly club. Then one day Mokey gets a letter saying that the Poohbah's would like to see her and find out if she's worthy of being a part of the club. She tells Red of her invitation, only to find out that she wasn't supposed to tell anyone about it. She goes back to find out if she can be a part of the society, but when a member called the Mind-Reader knows that Mokey told her roommate of the invitation, she's immediately rejected, but the Beggler Beg and the Vanguard (who look an awful lot like Gillis Fraggle and Convincing John) say that, if she brings her roommate to verify that Mokey's legit, she can be a Poohbah. Mokey gets all worked up about this, but when she brings Red back so she can be a Poohbah, Mokey finally learns not to take anything too serious that these Fraggles tell her.
59	11	"The Beanbarrow, the Burden and the Bright Bouquet"	Terry Maskell	B.P. Nichol	March 11, 1985	311
It's time for the annual Beanbarrow Race, and it's Gobo and Wembley vs. Red and Mokey. But when Mokey gets delayed, Red ends up having to do the race with Lanford, Mokey's annoying plant. As they're racing, Red and Lanford get lost at Table Rock Cavern which is where the Clinging Creepers live. When the Clinging Creepers start to attack them, Red and Lanford must work together in order to escape.
60	12	"Gobo's School for Explorers"	George Bloomfield	David Young	March 18, 1985	309
Gobo finds out about Uncle Matt's Secret Rules for Exploring through a postcard, and decides to open up a school for explorers. On his first expedition, he- along with Red, Wembley and Mokey- must travel to the Hole To Who-Knows-Where. Gobo becomes so fixated on the rules that he starts to disregard common sense, and of course, he and Red go at it again. Wembley and Mokey start to agree with Gobo's rules, but before long, they both side with Red. Gobo decides to go find the Hole To Who-Knows-Where by himself, not knowing that he is still tied on to Red. When Gobo and Red fall through the Hole, Gobo needs to use logic to get back home.
61	13	"Scared Silly"	Doug Williams	Jocelyn Stevenson	March 25, 1985	313
Boober's been testing baloobiuses, which are the part of a Fraggle's tail that flares up when scared. And when he tests Wembley's, Wembley wants to get even, so Philo and Gunge give him ideas on how to test his baloobius back. When hiding in the laundry and shouting "Boo!" doesn't work, he goes with an elaborate plan of setting up scary masks, spiders and snakes. Wembley goes back to Philo and Gunge to tell him of what he's set up, Marjorie tells him that when the boys tried scaring her, she nearly blew up. Wembley misunderstands this, and tries to go back to tear down his plan before Boober shows up, but he's too late, and thinks that Boober's blown up. Did Wembley go too far?
62	14	"The Great Radish Caper"	Terry Maskell	Sugith Varughese	April 1, 1985	314
Mokey's on her way out to get a radish, when she sees Junior talking to this gigantically huge radish named Geraldine. When she tries to take the radish back home, Junior catches her, and she sees that Junior has a problem. Junior asks her what it is, and she fools him into letting her go. Mokey shares this with her friends, and then Wembley, Gobo and Red decide to go have a look at it, only to almost be caught by Junior. Mokey then decides that, while they get the radish, she'll keep Junior occupied. Mokey gets caught again, and Junior makes her tell him what the problem is. She says that he has an obsession with a radish, and that what he really needs is a friend. The two of them go off to find Junior a friend, and while they're gone, Boober, Gobo, Wembley and Red go and get Geraldine before Junior gets back. When Mokey and Junior return, Junior becomes really upset that Geraldine's gone. Mokey feels terrible for what she's done, so it's up to her to make things right, and find out that Junior's had a friend all along.
63	15	"Born to Wander"	George Bloomfield	B.P. Nichol	April 8, 1985	315
The Storyteller's having a story-telling session in Gobo's room, so Gobo decides that he wants to hear about Uncle Matt's first big journey. We see a flashback of little Matt- who's dressed like Gobo is now-with his Uncle Gobo, who thinks that his nephew Matt is annoying and clueless. Back then, Fraggles either ate mushrooms or Doozer constructions, but when the mushrooms run out, Uncle Gobo and Matt try to find some food. However, Matt causes a rock quake, and breaks Uncle Gobo's leg. So Matt goes off by himself to find food, and as he's wandering, a rock slide occurs, and when it's over, Matt finds a hole out into the Gorg's Garden. He goes out to explore, scares Ma and Pa Gorg, and brings back to the Rock a radish, which Matt thinks is a shiny red boulder, thus giving the Fraggles a new food source.
64	16	"The Battle of Leaking Roof"	Eric Till	Robert Sandler	April 15, 1985	316
It's about to rain, and Ma wants Pa to fix the hole in the roof before it starts to pour. At the same time, Boober and Mokey are out getting radishes, and when Ma accidentally picks Boober up, he loses his hat. Boober's too afraid to go back out there, so Mokey goes out by herself to get the hat. Meanwhile, Ma's having a terrible time getting Pa to fix the roof, because he's too scared of heights. Will Pa get over his fear and fix the hole in the roof before the rainfall?
65	17	"Playing Till It Hurts"	Terry Maskell	Jerry Juhl	April 22, 1985	317
It's time for Rock Hockey, and Red's especially excited because her idol, Rock Hockey Hannah, is coming to watch her play. Her excitement's cut short, however, when she injures herself. She's still determined to play, and she escapes from her room to try it again, only to get even more hurt. But Red is becoming more and more stubborn; she doesn't want Hannah to think she's a wimp. So she decides to fool Feeny Fraggle and takes his place as goalie. But is playing the game to impress her hero worth the risk?
66	18	"Bored Stiff"	George Bloomfield	Jocelyn Stevenson	April 29, 1985	318
Gobo's wanting to go with Wembley out to the Gorg's Garden on an expedition. But their trip is cut short when they meet Mokey, Boober and Red at the hole to the garden, and they tell the boys that the Gorgs are right outside. Gobo decides that he's gonna find out what's going on. Meanwhile, Ma and Pa are playing around Kissing Rock, and Junior finds a spray can that's marked "Boredom Juice", a chemical that, when sprayed, causes anyone or anything to become permanently bored. When Ma spots Gobo, Pa sprays the juice into the Fraggle hole, causing Wembley, Red and Mokey to be bored. Then he tells Junior to use the juice on any Fraggles that come out of Kissing Rock. But Junior doesn't want to, and dumps it all on a flower. Later he spots Gobo, and they work together to convince Junior's parents that the Boredom Juice shouldn't be used. But when they rehearse the plan, Junior accidentally falls near the flower he dumped the rest of the juice on, and actually becomes bored. Now, it's up to Gobo to save his friends, and Junior, to prove that Fraggles provide a service to the Gorgs, especially to Junior.
67	19	"The Cavern of Lost Dreams"	Terry Maskell	B.P. Nichol	May 6, 1985	320
When Cotterpin Doozer hears that Gobo is the bravest Fraggle in the Rock, she gets him to help her find the Cavern of Lost Dreams, which is where the original tower was built. When they get there, the remaining two Doozers, Yeaster and Crusty, don't want to come back. Will these two Doozers finally accept the changes that have occurred and move back to the Rock and help build once again?
68	20	"The Incredible Shrinking Mokey"	Les Rose	Jocelyn Stevenson	May 13, 1985	321
Mokey and Red are putting on a puppet show and on their way to the production, Mokey hears the cries of a strange creature named Begoony, a magical fluffy critter who clings himself to Mokey and wants all of her attention. But when Mokey's torn between helping Begoony and putting on their show, Begoony puts a curse on her that makes her shrink, and then Begoony places her in a dollhouse. Mokey must find a way out and teach Begoony what being a friend means.
69	21	"A Dark and Stormy Night"	Norman Campbell	Sugith Varughese	May 20, 1985	319
Gobo feels as if he's done it all and wishes there was someplace he could explore. But when he hears that the Gorgs are going on a vacation, he thinks his problem is solved, and decides to map the inside of the Gorg's castle. Meanwhile, Ma and Pa are going on their second honeymoon, and they want Junior to stay behind and watch the castle. When Gobo tells everyone of his new exploration, the other Fraggles think the Gorgs are going to be in the castle while he's exploring. But when Red and Mokey find out that the Gorgs are leaving, Red becomes upset with Gobo, thinking that he lied to them. So she gets Boober and Mokey to help scare Gobo, who's got Wembley by his side for the overnight stay. But when the Crown Jewel becomes missing, Junior gets scared and thinks somebody's in the castle. When Gobo and the gang reveal themselves to Junior, Junior later thinks that there's a real thief outside. Junior must work with the Fraggles to catch the jewel thief in order to prove to his parents he's mature enough to watch over the castle.
70	22	"Gunge the Great and Glorious"	Eric Till	Laura Phillips	May 27, 1985	322
When the Architect Doozer is teaching some younger Doozers about the great Doozer king (who looks a LOT like Gunge) Gunge wanders in the middle of the teaching session while looking for the M'Geecky vines for Marjorie. The Doozers think he's their long lost king, which makes Philo jealous, and he convinces the Doozers that the king isn't Gunge, it's Philo. Their friendship is divided, but the Trash Heap later reminds Philo that friendships last much longer than all the riches in the world.

=== Season 4 (1986) ===
No. overall	No. in season	Title	Directed by	Written by	Original release date	Prod. code
71	1	"Sprocket's Big Adventure"	Eric Till	Sugith Varughese	January 6, 1986	401
Doc still doesn't believe Sprocket when he says there's furry creatures behind the hole in the workshop. So Sprocket finally makes his way into Fraggle Rock to find Gobo, and causes all kinds of mayhem. When he runs into the Doozers, the Doozers hire him to knock down all their buildings so they can rebuild. But Boober seems to be allergic to Sprocket, so when the Fraggles find out the Hairy Monster is in Fraggle Rock, they use Boober to find him. Sprocket finds his way out into the Gorg's Garden, and even meets the Trash Heap. But when Gobo gets caught by Junior, Sprocket and Gobo must work together to get Junior to let him go, so Gobo can take Sprocket back home.
72	2	"Wembley's Wonderful Whoopie Water"	Terry Maskell	Jerry & Susan Juhl	January 13, 1986	324
Wembley's got a special talent; he can hear water in the rock walls. But when Gobo and Red don't believe him, he sets out to prove he's right. When water finally breaks out, the Fraggles discover that this type of water is special. But when the water starts to cause rock quakes and Gobo falls into the cracks, is it finally time to shut down the fun?
73	3	"Sidebottom Blues"	Norman Campbell	David Young	January 20, 1986	323
When Boober shows Wembley all of his ointments and medicines, Wembley thinks Boober doesn't have enough fun, and invites him to the garden to play Follow the Leader with the rest of their friends. First Boober accepts, but then he overhears Gobo talking about Boober being a big goof (when really, Gobo's referring to Junior), he gets upset and very hurt, and decides to let Sidebottom out and turns into "Dr. Fun." The other Fraggles worry that Boober's going too far, but when Boober hypnotizes Junior into thinking he's a Fraggle, the fun begins. Then Wembley starts to have an allergic reaction to the Bonkleberry stew, and the situation becomes problematic, and it's time for Dr. Fun to step aside before it's too late.
74	4	"Uncle Matt's Discovery"	Norman Campbell	Jerry Juhl	January 27, 1986	402
Uncle Matt's coming back home again, and this time when he shows up, he hides under the party table in Gobo's room to avoid what he calls "Face Erasers." Red mocks Matt's cowardice. Gobo then gets upset that Matt would not admit his fear, so Matt goes exploring by himself. When Wembley convinces Gobo to go after him, they find a scary wooden statue of a Fraggle. When Matt accidentally hits it, they both fall through the floor and happen upon a whole new cavern with dozens of tunnels. And when you hit the arch to the tunnel, you get sucked into another region of "Outer Space", thus providing new places for Gobo and Uncle Matt to explore.
75	5	"Junior Faces the Music"	Terry Maskell	Robert Sandler	February 3, 1986	403
Tonight is the night of the Blue Moon, and when Junior Gorg notices this, he begs Pa to let him play the Royal Kazoo to prove that he'll be a great, worthy king. But the moon needs to be full, and one also needs five Fraggle witnesses. But when Pa dismisses the idea in fear of Junior being banished, Junior feels like he'll never be much of anything. Then, when Cantus the Minstrel shows up (as a shadowy figure), he convinces Junior that he needs to believe in himself and that he can do anything he wants to. Cantus makes Junior promise to play the Royal Kazoo, and then Cantus goes to get the five Fraggle witnesses; Gobo, Mokey, Red, Wembley and Boober. Once they show up, it's time for Junior to prove what kind of king he'll be.
76	6	"A Tune for Two"	Les Rose	Laura Phillips	February 10, 1986	405
It's time for the Duet-athon! Wembley's supposed to be paired up with Gobo, but when Matt comes back home for another visit, Gobo gets paired up with his uncle instead. Then Wembley tries to get Boober to join him, but when Tosh Fraggle comes along, Boober just can't resist doing a song about one of his interests. Wembley becomes sad, and thinks no one wants to be with him in the Duet-athon. While Wembley's crying, Cotterpin Doozer comes along and tries to cheer him up, saying she'll be in the competition with him. When Wembley then goes to Gillis Fraggle to sign her up as his partner, Gillis rudely tells him Doozers are not allowed in the contest. Wembley goes back and delivers the bad news to Cotterpin, saying she can't be in it with him. She gets mad and leaves, prompting Wembley to stand up to Gillis, telling him that just because the Duet-athon has always been just for Fraggles, it doesn't make it right. He starts up a protest rally, and before long, all the Fraggles say that if Cotterpin isn't allowed to join, they'll all drop out, leaving Gillis no choice but to do the right thing... leading to the greatest Duet-athon ever.
77	7	"The Perfect Blue Rollie"	Eric Till	David Young	February 17, 1986	404
One day as Wembley and Boober are going down by Roaring Rivene, they come upon a huge collection of colorful smoothies and rollies, the greatest gift you can give to a Fraggle. But then, something even more amazing happens; Wembley spots the Perfect Blue Rollie, the rarest pebble in the universe. He gives it to Boober in the spirit of giving. But Boober becomes selfish with the rollie and puts it in his Hidey Hole, a cave where Boober keeps all of his stuff. When Gobo, Red and Mokey see it, they do their best to get Boober to bring it to the Great Hall and have a party. Boober becomes even more selfish, kicks his friends out, and spends his time protecting the rollie from being stolen. But when Wembley unsuccessfully sneaks in as a ball of laundry lint to steal it back, a cave-in occurs, leaving Boober inside. It's up to his friends to save him before Boober becomes trapped forever, with all his 'stuff.'
78	8	"A Brush with Jealousy"	Terry Maskell	B.P. Nichol	February 24, 1986	406
Mokey's well-known for being a terrific painter, but when Red takes down one of her paintings and puts up one of Pedley Fraggle's (another great painter), she sets out to show everyone how much better of a painter she is. When she goes to the Trash Heap for a paintbrush, Marjorie gives her a magical paintbrush that, when used for the wrong reasons, takes control of the Fraggle using it. Mokey doesn't consider herself the jealous type, but she's proven wrong when she tries to out-paint Pedley and she can't seem to let go of the brush. Mokey needs to find a way to get the brush to quit controlling her, and realize why she loved painting in the first place.
79	9	"Wembley's Flight"	Eric Till	Jerry Juhl	March 3, 1986	407
When Wembley rescues a Spider Fly from a Snare Blossom, the fly turns into a strange old creature that will grant Wembley any wish he wants to for setting him free. Wembley decides he wants to fly, so the creature gives him the ability, but Wembley's only allowed to fly three times. He uses his first time up almost immediately, but then he goes to find his friends to show them his new ability. Wembley's story isn't quite believable to his friends, which upsets Wembley because everyone else gets to show off what they're good at. He decides he's going to fly for the Fraggles who will believe him... so he seeks out Feeny, Marlon, and Large Marvin to show them his flying abilities. But Gobo, Mokey and Red stop him from doing so because they believe he'll just hurt himself. Finally, he decides that showing off for his friends isn't what he wanted the flying abilities for; he wanted to fly just to fly.
80	10	"Red's Blue Dragon"	Terry Maskell	Jerry & Susan Juhl	March 10, 1986	409
Red's been reading a series of adventure books starring Princess Gwenalot, including "Gwenelot and the Blue Dragon", lately, and when Gobo tells her she needs to grow up and stop playing make-believe, she happens upon the T. Matthew Fraggle Room, the cavern with the dozens of tunnels that lead to different places in "Outer Space." But when she accidentally spots a huge, blue dragon, it gets lost in Fraggle Rock. She tries to convince Gobo and Uncle Matt about the dragon, but they just think she's played make-believe too much, so it's up to Red to make things right.
81	11	"Wonder Mountain"	George Bloomfield	Robert Sandler	March 17, 1986	408
Mokey wants to go all the way up to Wonder Mountain to see the Aurora Fragglialis, which only occurs once every 1000 days. But Red's worried about Mokey going alone, and even though she promised Mokey she trusted her enough to go by herself, Red decides to leave the duties of plant-sitting Lanford to Gobo, Boober and Wembley to watch over Mokey so nothing bad happens. The only problem is, Red falls victim to almost everything, while the dreamy Mokey just keeps going on. She gets torn up through some rough brush, falls off the Invisible Bridge, and almost gets enchanted by the Singing Cactus, when Mokey spots her and saves her. When asked why she decided to come along, Red says she wants to see the Aurora Fragglialis too. But later on, as they go past where the Avalanche Monster lives, he wakes up, and chases down the two girls. It's up to Mokey and Red to work together to get the Rock Monster off their tails in order to go and experience the Aurora Fragglialis before it's too late.
82	12	"Space Frog Follies"	George Bloomfield	David Young	March 24, 1986	410
Gobo's getting ready to have a surprise party for himself, but when Uncle Matt shows up and says he can't come to the party, Gobo gets upset. Meanwhile, Matt takes Wembley aside and shows him the present he got for Gobo; a space frog. Matt then tells him that he wants Wembley to watch over it until he gets back from "Outer Space" so he can collect flies for the frog to eat. So it's up to Wembley to keep the space frog a secret until Matt gets back, but he has a hard time doing so. But is keeping the space frog in a jar, as a pet, for the rest of his life really the best thing for him? It's up to Wembley to decide what's best for the space frog, even if it means upsetting his buddy.
83	13	"Boober Gorg"	Terry Maskell	Sugith Varughese	March 31, 1986	411
Boober's well-known for cooking excellent recipes with radishes, and one day while creating another famous dish, the pot explodes, and the radish falls on Boober's head, giving him amnesia, and it's up to his friends to find a cure. When Boober has a sudden strike of familiarization with radishes, Gobo takes him to the Gorg's Garden, hoping that seeing the Gorgs will scare him back to normal. Meanwhile, in the garden, Pa's been reading "The Book of Gorgish Myth & Wisdom", and according to the book, this is the day an evil sorcerer is supposed to appear. And when Junior seems to be missing, Pa and Ma think the sorcerer's done something terrible to him. And when Boober sees the Gorgs, he has an identity crisis, and thinks he's a Gorg too. Pa and Ma think that the sorcerer turned Junior into a Fraggle, so they have to teach him all over again. Gobo finds Boober and tries once again to tell him he's a Fraggle, but Boober doesn't believe him. So Gobo goes back to Mokey, Red and Wembley and prepares a plan to get Boober back to Fraggle Rock. But Boober, still thinking he's a Gorg, overhears this and gets Ma and Pa to help him catch the Fraggles. Once they're all caught, the Gorgs leave it up to Boober to decide their fate. Will Boober finally snap out of it before his friends get thumped?

=== Season 5 (1987) ===
No. overall	No. in season	Title	Directed by	Written by	Original release date	Prod. code
84	1	"Mirror, Mirror"	Wayne Moss	Jocelyn Stevenson	January 5, 1987	412
Red Fraggle's been having a lot of parties lately, and today will be her 28th 'birthday' since the Festival of the Bells. But when the other four seem uninterested in celebrating with her again, she goes off by herself, and runs into Cotterpin Doozer, who left her job of stirring glue to celebrate with Red. As the girls are singing, they come upon a magical mirror, named Mavis, who can sing, whistle, yodel, gurgle, and see the future. She tells Red that she sees, in the future, Red will have a party that she'll never forget. Cotterpin leaves after getting tired of Mavis calling her a 'bug,' but Red keeps pushing Mavis until they arrive to the hole that leads into the Gorg's castle. In the castle, Pa and Junior are going honk-fishing, leaving Ma alone on her birthday. Ma becomes really sad, but when she hears yodeling coming from the hole in the wall, she picks up Mavis, and they have a chat. Red gets angry that the Gorg stole her new friend away, so she goes inside to save her. Once Red arrives, Mavis tries to convince Ma and Red to have the party together. Red goes along with it, only so she can get Mavis out of there. Her plan goes wrong when Mavis falls off the table and breaks, leaving Ma furious. Now, Red has to find some way to put Mavis back together, and Cotterpin just may be the Doozer to help.
85	2	"The Riddle of Rhyming Rock"	Terry Maskell	B.P. Nichol	January 12, 1987	413
Gobo wants to solve the Riddle of Rhyming Rock, and he's been rehearsing for quite some time. According to Rhyming Rock's caretaker Herkimer Fraggle, each Fraggle only gets three chances in a lifetime, and when Gobo uses his first two and fails, he goes to the Storyteller to find out how to solve it. She then tells him that Uncle Matt, when he was really young, uncovered a book that could solve all riddles (The riddle goes, "Mumba Gumba, Dinky-Doo. Pants for me. Answer YOU!) But, when he finds out that the spell doesn't work, Wembley becomes stuck underneath a rockslide. Now Gobo needs to find a way to get his friend out and get Rhyming Rock again. And if he makes that happen, he just might be the first Fraggle in history to crack the riddle.
86	3	"The Voice Inside"	Eric Till	Laura Phillips	January 19, 1987	414
Gobo's wanting to take his friends to Grey Rock Ridge and explore, but when everybody backs out- including Wembley, who's having a rock dust allergy attack- Gobo goes by himself. Wembley tries to tell him that, maybe this is a sign to not go at all. Gobo thinks his friend's just being silly and takes off alone. Meanwhile, Cotterpin's telling her friends Hammerhead and Wrench about Gobo and how brave he is, and how he always goes on adventures. Wrench wanders off, he runs into Sprocket, who's made his way back into Fraggle Rock to find Gobo. and when the three meet, they all go to Grey Rock Ridge together. But before they get there, they come across a rock windstorm. Was Wembley right when he told Gobo not to go in the first place?
87	4	"The Trial of Cotterpin Doozer"	Wayne Moss	Jerry Juhl	January 26, 1987	415
It's another great day in Fraggle Rock, and today, Red's helping Cotterpin make her plans for a new bridge when suddenly, the Fraggle Horn is blown and Red must take off for the meeting. Not far from where Cotterpin is, there's a Doozer named Tumbrell who's not a big fan of Cotterpin and sees that she's breaking a violation: consorting with Fraggles. Meanwhile in the Great Hall, Mokey tells everyone she spotted a Poison Cackler's nest, so Gobo gets everyone to go with him to the Lesser Galleries on a small vacation. But when Large Marvin and Feenie don't make it to when the Fraggles all take off, they're left behind. Cotterpin's being put on trial for telling Red of her building plans. She's given a chance to prove that Fraggles are noble and intelligent creatures, so she tries to find her friends, but the only Fraggles she comes across are the only two left in the Rock... Large Marvin and Feenie, two of the dumbest Fraggles alive. The Doozers aren't convinced that these two are worthy, but when a Baby Poison Cackler appears and captures Cotterpin, Feenie and Large Marvin must work together to save her and all the Doozers. Meanwhile, Uncle Traveling Matt observes the outdoor relaxing of Doc and Sprocket.
88	5	"The River of Life"	Eric Till	David Young	February 2, 1987	416
When Doc comes into the workshop, he has a surprising look on his face, and then tells Sprocket that he just met a man on the street who could make him $100,000 richer; all Doc has to do is allow the man to dump industrial waste into the limestone caves below the shop. When Sprocket hears this, he wants Doc to not take the deal, because there's furry creatures who live down there. Meanwhile, Boober doesn't feel like going for a swim today when a heat wave strikes Fraggle Rock. Instead, he wants to do some 'anting' (watching ants). But when he smells something terrible in the water, he tries to go and stop his friends from swimming before they get contaminated. But it's too late, and all the Fraggles except Boober fall terribly ill. Boober then goes up to the Trash Heap and tells her the news. Marjorie then tells him that "if there's a problem in the river of life, it gets past into everybody's surface." She then tells him that he needs to go to "Outer Space." The Gorgs' water has been poisoned too when Ma and Pa Gorg return from the stream where they have been wading and when they think it's the Fraggle's fault, Boober tells them that it's the Silly Creatures from "Outer Space." Pa Gorg then assigns Boober to go there and straighten things out. But Boober's feeling incredibly helpless, and has no idea how to get the Silly Creatures to stop contaminating the water. Will Boober finally go to "Outer Space" alone and save the Universe? Or will Doc take the money?
89	6	"Beyond the Pond"	Terry Maskell	Jocelyn Stevenson	February 9, 1987	417
When Red and Gobo are getting ready to have a swim meet, the contest gets cut short when the Knobblies- thick, pink vines- come to the surface of the pond, leaving almost no room to swim. Boober brings some Kolerabi juice by for his friends to drink, but nobody likes it. But when Red accidentally spills the juice on the vines, the vines shrink and die, giving more room in the pond. Boober then rushes back to make more so the swim race can still go on. When Red grabs one of the vines, they give her a vision, with weird creatures saying, "Follow the roots." Red then dives into the very bottom of the pond to find out where the message is coming from, and discovers that the vines are roots to a huge, underwater tree. When Red gets to the top of the tree, she finds five Merggles (mermaid Fraggles); Merboo, Merkey, Mermer, Merple, and Mervin. They are delighted that their message to Red worked, since they're now able to communicate with another species besides themselves. Meanwhile, back at the pond, Boober's Kolerabi juice is being dumped by the bucketload onto the Knobblies, and while Red's celebrating with the Merggles, the branches start dying, and they can't figure out why. Red then tells them of Boober's juice, and they lock Red in a cage, then swim far away before they die. But when Gobo grabs one of the vines up by the pond, he receives a vision to "Stop pouring the Kolerabi juice", and "Follow the Knobblies", which he does. It's up to Gobo to go find and rescue her before the tree dies and the Merggles leave forever.
90	7	"Gone But Not Forgotten"	Eric Till	Laura Phillips	February 16, 1987	418
Wembley's really excited today, because today is going to be his first solo, overnight hike. But while on the way, he becomes trapped in a rockslide, and when he wakes up, he's being comforted by Mudwell the Mudbunny- the rarest creature in the Rock. Mudwell and Wembley have such a wonderful time together, and seem to be great friends. But when Wembley wakes up from his nap later on, Mudwell tells him, rudely, to leave and never come back again. When Wembley returns, he's upset, and the other four make him share his story about Mudwell. Gobo tells him that maybe he should go back and have Mudwell explain, so Wembley goes back, just as Mudwell is lying by a mud puddle. He tells Wembley that he'd like to be friends, but it's time for him to leave. After Mudwell becomes quiet, Wembley realizes that the Mudbunny has died. When Wembley sees his four friends again, he's really sad, so all four of them- and The World's Oldest Fraggle- try to cheer him up but fail. Finally Gobo tells him that, even though Mudwell's gone, there's ways of keeping part of him alive. So Wembley gets an idea, and goes back to where Mudwell died, only to discover something truly unique about Mudbunnies.
91	8	"Mokey, Then and Now"	Eric Till	Jocelyn Stevenson	February 23, 1987	419
When Mokey, Wembley, and Boober are rehearsing their lines for the show their putting on later in the day, they come across The Sacred Cavern, where they see an ancient drawing of a Fraggle. While doing a chant, without knowing what would happen, the three Fraggles get transported back in time where Fraggles had leaders, they were bald, and they were far too serious. Luckily, Mokey, Boober, and Wembley are wearing caps, so these Fraggles don't see that the Fraggles from the future aren't bald. When the leader, Fishface, asks who they are, Mokey claims to be her ancestor, the great Blundig, their ancient leader who was destined to return. But when the tribe of Fraggles see they're lying, they lock the three up in a place that looks a LOT like Gobo and Wembley's room. And now, it's up to Mokey to find a way to change these Fraggles for the better, and get home before something terrible happens.
92	9	"Ring Around the Rock"	Terry Maskell	Sugith Varughese	March 2, 1987	420
Ma and Pa Gorg are having their 513th wedding anniversary and are going to renew their vows. Pa asks Junior to hold onto the wedding ring. When Junior puts on the ring, he decides it is too small, so when he struggles to get it off, he flings it across the garden into a tiny hole, where Gobo just happens to be exploring. The ring falls on Gobo's head, and Gobo rushes the ring back home and gives it to Wembley. After he does that, Gobo goes back to wait for other objects to appear. But Junior's digging a hole where it fell, and when he sees Gobo, he picks him up, and begs him to bring the ring back. But it's going to be hard, because the ring just seems to be getting passed along to everybody. Will Ma and Pa have to call off the wedding? Or will Junior have to find something else in place of the ring for Pa to give to Ma?
93	10	"Inspector Red"	George Bloomfield	Jerry & Susan Juhl	March 9, 1987	421
When the Fraggle Horn appears missing, Red plays detective and helps the World's Oldest Fraggle to find it again. However, Red's not doing a good job, for she seems to be falsely accusing Uncle Matt, Boober, and Marlon Fraggle. Finally, it's up to Red to think of a plan that would make the guilty Fraggle confess... but how is she going to do that without falsely accusing anyone else again?
94	11	"The Gorg Who Would Be King"	Terry Maskell	Laura Phillips	March 16, 1987	423
Pa takes Junior to the Nirvana tree, a tree that, when the last leaf falls, it will be Junior's turn to reign over the universe. But Junior becomes really scared when there's only one leaf on the tree left. Junior then decides to eat the last leaf, so that the leaf doesn't officially fall. When he does this, he shrinks to the size of a Fraggle. Meanwhile, Mokey wants to show Wembley the Nirvana tree, and when Pa spots them, he chases them away. When he does this, he spots Junior who, to Pa, is really a Fraggle. Junior then escapes into Fraggle Rock, and bumps into Wembley. After telling Wembley of how he shrunk, Wembley takes him to the Trash Heap. When they get there, Marjorie tells him that he needs to be small in order to see the universe in a way he hasn't seen it before. Wembley and Junior make their way back to Fraggle Rock, but not before getting chased by Pa again. When the two make it back to the Great Hall, the Fraggles laugh at Junior's stature, and then tell him that Fraggles don't have bosses. Then Junior meets Cotterpin Doozer, who tells him that the sticks they make are from Radishes, and Junior realizes that it all fits together; he likes growing radishes, Doozers build with radishes, and Fraggles eat radishes. Junior thinks he's ready to be big again, but before he sees his parents again, he must defuse a bomb that Pa has thrown down into the Rock. Will Junior defuse it in time? More importantly, does the universe really need a ruler when things seem to be just fine without one?
95	12	"The Honk of Honks"	Richard Hunt	Jocelyn Stevenson	March 23, 1987	422
Gobo goes into "Outer Space" in search of an adventure. But when he realizes that Doc can't see him, but Sprocket can, Gobo becomes amazed. Meanwhile, Wembley catches up to his pal and tells him Cantus is coming back. When Cantus arrives, he tells the Fraggles it's time for the Song of Songs, and in order to do that, one Fraggle must create the Honk of Honks. He assigns Gobo to the task, to which Gobo refuses at first to go back up to "Outer Space" to see the Silly Creature again. Cantus finds him and tells him the Honk of Honks is much more important. He later tells him that, in order to make the Honk work, he needs to realize that "We're all a part of everything, and everything is a part of us." Gobo then gets a honking device from the Trash Heap, Junior Gorg, and Cotterpin Doozer, and connects them all to the Fraggle Horn. But it wasn't the true Honk of Honks, and Cantus cancels the celebration. Later, Gobo and Cantus have words, and Cantus tells him that he finally needs to touch the Silly Creature in order for both of them to see. So, it's up to Gobo to finally make contact with Doc, in order to finally understand what it means to touch someone and see. And maybe—just maybe—everyone can finally be a part of the true Song of Songs.
96	13	"Change of Address"	Eric Till	Jerry Juhl	March 30, 1987	424
After hearing that Ned Shimmelfinny has to move to the desert for his health, Doc decides that he and Sprocket will move there to be with their friend. But Doc wants to see Gobo one last time. Down in Fraggle Rock, Gobo's just getting over the Fraggle Flu, which means he hasn't been up to the hole to "Outer Space" to see the treats Doc and Sprocket have left him. When Red brings a note to Gobo from Doc, saying that they have to leave but want to see Gobo one last time, Gobo goes up to visit the Silly Creature, to find out his name is really Jerome Crystal, but his nickname is Doc. Gobo tells Doc that exploring is what he does. Doc then asks if Gobo wants to move with them and explore the desert, an area of Outer Space that Gobo's Uncle Matt has not even explored, but Gobo gets scared and runs away, leaving Doc and Sprocket sad. Gobo's not feeling too happy either, he can't leave Fraggle Rock but making friends with a silly creature and getting the chance to explore Outer Space was the opportunity of a lifetime and he's blown it. When he goes to Marjorie for advice, she says that he needs to tell Doc that "He cannot leave the magic." Gobo runs back up to "Outer Space", along with Boober, Red, Wembley and Mokey. But when he gets there, the workshop is completely empty, and Doc and Sprocket have moved. Doc does leave Gobo a message on a tape recorder, and Gobo's friends join him in listening to the good-bye message. When the Fraggles leave, Red makes the comment, "Maybe the Silly Creature left, but we never would." Then Wembley says, "Yeah Gobo... we could never leave you." And when Wembley says this, Gobo finally understands the Trash Heap's message. Maybe Gobo's not too late, after all.
