= Fraggle Rockin': A Collection =

Fraggle Rockin': A Collection (marketed before release as The Fraggle Rockin' Collection) is a three-disc CD box set of music from the TV series Fraggle Rock, released by KOCH Records on October 30, 2007. The set contains 53 tracks. The three discs were originally released from 1983 to 1993 as three separate soundtrack albums.

The collector's edition includes photos and contributions from the original composers, including Dennis Lee and Philip Balsam, as well as sheet music for select songs.

== Track listing ==
=== Disc 1: Fraggle Rock ===
1. Fraggle Rock Theme
2. Follow Me
3. Convincing John
4. Doozer Knitting Song
5. Do It On My Own
6. Wemblin' Fool
7. Why?
8. Lost and Found
9. Catch the Tail by the Tiger
10. Brave Boy, Jump Up
11. Muck and Goo
12. Friendship Song
13. Fraggle Rock Rock
14. Beetle Song
15. Easy is the Only Way to Go
16. Our Melody

=== Disc 2: Music and Magic ===
1. Fraggle Rock Theme
2. Pukka, Pukka, Pukka Squeetily Boink
3. Let Me Be Your Song
4. Wemblin' Fool
5. Yes, We Can
6. Catch the Tail by the Tiger
7. There's a Lot I Want to Know
8. Follow Me
9. Friends 'Til The End
10. Is It True?
11. The Rock Goes On
12. Pass It On
13. Just Don't Know What Time it Is
14. Convincing John
15. Get Goin'
16. Doozer Knitting Song
17. The Way I've Go To Go
18. Only Way Home
19. Stuff Samba
20. Sweet, Sweet Little Treat
21. Closing Theme

=== Disc 3: Perfect Harmony ===
1. Fraggle Rock Theme
2. Go with the Flow
3. Perfect Harmony
4. Without a Hat
5. Music Box
6. Here to There
7. Sail Away
8. Workin'
9. Dum De Dum
10. Ragtime Queen
11. I Seen Troubles
12. Dreaming of Someone
13. Pantry Chant
14. Helping Hand
15. Time to Live as One
16. Closing Theme

== See also ==
- Fraggle Rock
