= The Tale of the Bunny Picnic =

1986 film directed by Jim Henson

- Genre: Adventure; Comedy; Family; Musical
- Written by: Jocelyn Stevenson
- Directed by: Jim Henson; David G. Hillier
- Starring: Steve Whitmire; Richard Hunt; Jim Henson; Martin P. Robinson
- Music by: Philip Balsam
- Countries of origin: United Kingdom; United States
- Original language: English

Production
- Executive producer: Diana Birkenfield
- Producer: Jim Henson
- Cinematography: John Wiggins
- Editor: David Hambelton
- Production company: Henson Associates

Original release
- Network: HBO
- Release: March 29, 1986

The Tale of the Bunny Picnic is a 1986 Easter television special directed by Jim Henson and David G. Hillier. In the United States it was shown annually on HBO in the spring, usually during Easter time. It was later released on VHS in 1993. The film focuses on the Muppet character Bean Bunny (Steve Whitmire), who makes his first appearance in this special, and would later appear on additional projects featuring Jim Henson's Muppets. It was screened twice in the United Kingdom, first on March 29, 1986, on BBC One, then again on December 13, 1986.

When the special originally aired on HBO, it opened with a live-action introduction that showed Jim Henson walking through a park on a spring day. In the introduction, he explains the inspiration for the story. In a park one day, he saw a large gathering of bunnies and had the thought that it looked like a bunny picnic. All of a sudden, a dog came running up and the bunnies scattered. This incident led to the creation of the television special. This introduction was not included in either of the VHS releases.

== Plot ==
Bean Bunny wishes he could help with the preparations for the Bunny Picnic, but he is told by his older brother Lugsy that he is too small and will only get in the way. Feeling very disappointed, Bean wanders off alone into the lettuce patch, where he imagines himself as the king of the bunny picnic and community and then encounters a farmer's dog, who chases him around the patch. Bean runs away and escapes the dog and warns the village, but none of the other bunnies believe him. They conclude that there is no dog and that Bean is simply making up the story for attention.

At first, it seems that the farmer's dog is the story antagonist, but it is revealed that it is his master the farmer that wants him to get the bunnies for his stew. The dog is only trying to protect himself from the wrath of the farmer by hunting the bunnies.

The bunnies soon discover that the dog is indeed real and out to get them. After much debating and futile attempts to rid themselves of the farmer's dog, the bunnies finally listen to Bean, who seems to have a solution to their problem. Inspired by a story about a giant hedgehog, they all hide inside of a giant bunny costume to frighten the dog, except Lugsy who went out for a sleeping potion only to get captured by the dog. The dog, being threatened by the farmer to catch the rabbits or starve, sets out to pursue the bunnies. When he enters their village he is confronted by the "Giant Bunny". The dog is frightened and begs for mercy, which the Giant Bunny grants to him. However, Bean goes into convulsions upon being told of the farmer's intent to stew any captured rabbits, and his spasms cause the costume to fall apart, revealing the bunnies to the dog.

The dog is now infuriated by this deception and captures Bean, but only for a brief moment as Lugsy and their sister Twitch get him back. But just as Bean escapes and before the dog is able to attack the bunnies, the farmer appears. The dog cowers as his angry master approaches. The bunnies, feeling sympathy for the scared dog, decide to forgive the dog and help him against the vicious farmer. They run at the farmer singing an empowering song. The farmer, with his allergy to bunnies acting up, begins sneezing uncontrollably causing his pants to fall down and runs off never to threaten the bunnies' village again. The bunnies then welcome the dog into their village and name him "Mr. Dee-Dop Dee-Diddly-Dog Bop."

The film then goes back to an elderly Bean (Now called "Grandpa Bean" by one of the young bunnies) who finishes telling the story. The dog, by now aged as well, is with him as he does. The film ends with the bunnies, celebrating the picnic with the dog.

== Cast ==
- Jim Henson - Himself

=== Muppet performers ===
- Steve Whitmire - Bean Bunny
- Camille Bonora - Twitch Bunny
- Louise Gold - Mother Bunny
- Kevin Clash - Be-Bop Bunny, Father Bunny
- Richard Hunt - Lugsy Bunny
- Ron Mueck - Storyteller Bunny
- Karen Prell - Baby Bunny, Babble Bunny, Great Grandmother Bunny
- Mike Quinn - Bulbous, Mayor Bunnyparte
- Martin P. Robinson - Farmer
- David Rudman - Snort Bunny, Snail
- Jim Henson - Farmer's Dog

== Home media ==
The Tale of the Bunny Picnic was released on VHS by Virgin Video in the United Kingdom and CEL Video in Australia in 1986. For its second VHS release, it was distributed by Buena Vista Home Video under the Jim Henson Video imprint in the United States in 1993 and in Australia as part of the Muppet Story Time series in 1994.
