= Karen Prell =

American puppeteer and animator (born 1959)

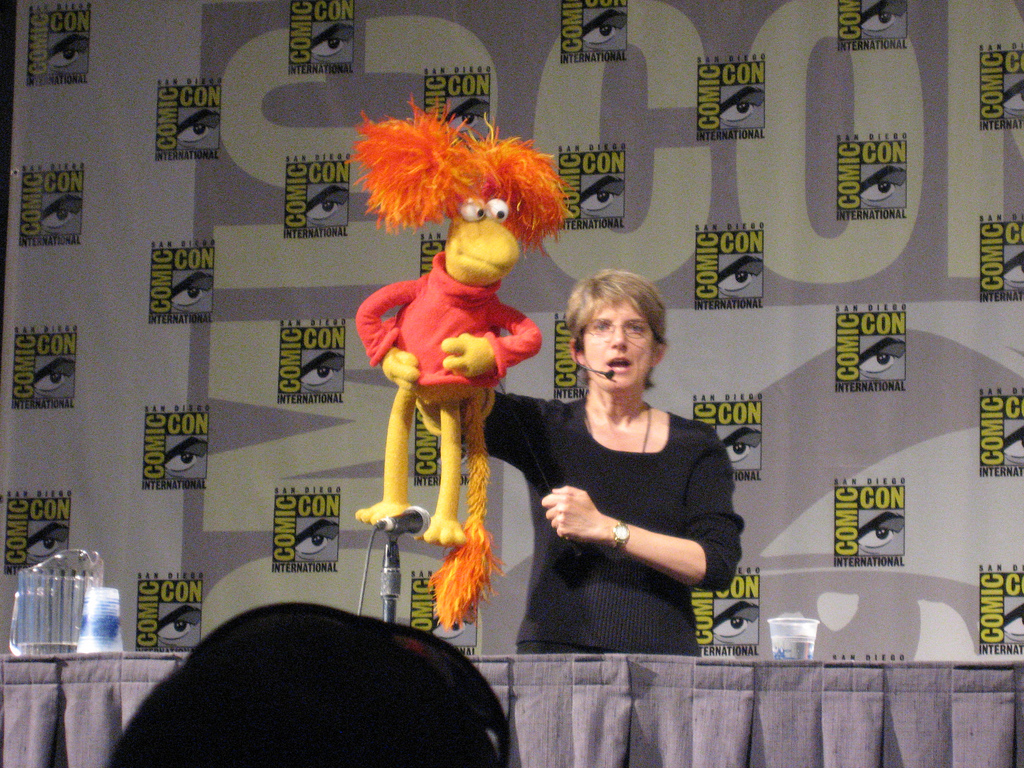
- Karen Prell and Red Fraggle at San Diego Comic-Con.
- Born: Karen Leigh Prell; July 26, 1959 (age 67); Florida, U.S.
- Occupations: Puppeteer, animator
- Years active: 1980–present
- Spouse: Mike Quinn (m. 1988; div. 2004)
- Website: www.karenprell.com

Karen Leigh Prell (born July 26, 1959) is an American puppeteer and animator. She is the performer of Red Fraggle in Fraggle Rock and did character animation for Pixar and Valve Corporation.

== Early life and career ==
Prell was born on July 26, 1959, in Florida but grew up in Seattle, Washington. She also performed some characters in other Jim Henson films and has enjoyed a significant second career as a computer animator for such studios as Pixar and DNA. On Sesame Street, she performed Deena Monster, as well as several background and one-off characters. She performed on the show from 1980 to 1981 for seasons 11 and 12, then returned in 2019 for season 50. She also performed in the 2003 attraction Sesame Street 4-D Movie Magic. Her website includes notes about working with Jim Henson and pictures of her custom puppets.

She puppeteered the Worm in Henson's 1986 film Labyrinth.

Prell started a "second career" when she joined Pixar in 1997. Here, she was an animator for Geri's Game and worked on animation of A Bug's Life and Toy Story 2.

In 2007, Prell began working for Valve Corporation, despite having no history of playing video games. She began this "third career" as an animator and playtester for Left 4 Dead 2, and followed this by doing concept work and animation for the Team Fortress 2 "Meet the Team" shorts. Her most notable character work for Valve was on Wheatley in Portal 2, which was influenced by her hand puppet work and involved "creating an extensive and intricately planned library of reusable movement and acting components that could be rapidly composited together to create unique actions for each of his hundreds of lines of dialogue." In a career retrospective, PC Gamer stated that "Prell did the impossible: She bestowed life on an orb."

Outside of her screen work, Prell has made public appearances performing Red Fraggle, like appearances at Comic Con. At Dragon Con 2013, Karen Prell was joined by fellow puppeteer Kathryn Mullen as part of the 30th Anniversary of Fraggle Rock where they performed their respective characters. She returned to perform Red Fraggle again for the 2020 Apple TV+ reboot Fraggle Rock: Rock On!, and the series reboot Fraggle Rock: Back to the Rock, of which she is also co-executive producer.

== Personal life ==
Prell married fellow Muppet performer Mike Quinn. They lived for a decade in England before moving to California to work for Pixar. Since divorcing in 2004, Prell and Quinn have continued to work together on different projects, usually involving the Muppets.

== Filmography ==
=== Television ===
- Fraggle Rock – Red Fraggle, Wingnut Doozer, Fluffinella, Baby Tree Creature, Beastie, Gavel Doozer, Marley Fraggle, Modem Doozer, Additional Muppets
- Jim Henson's Animal Show – Ollie the Tapir, Tizzie the Bee (1994–1995), Alexis the Giraffe, Arlene the Aardvark, Bernice the Warthog, Blanche the Manatee, Charlotte the Penguin, Hettie the Hedgehog, Hillary the Owl, Kasey the Kangaroo, Leah the Fruit Bat, Lydia the Ostrich, Rhonda the Raccoon
- Jim Henson's Mother Goose Stories – Yellow, (in "Tommy Tucker"), Little Boy Blue's Mother (in "Boy Blue"), (in "Boy Blue"), Topiary Peacock (in "Dicky Birds"), Peter the Dicky (in "Dicky Birds"), Old Mother Hubbard (in "Mother Hubbard"), Peter's Wife (in "Peter, Peter Pumpkin Eater")
- Sesame Street – Deena, Masha, Additional Muppets
- The Ghost of Faffner Hall – Mimi
- The Muppet Show – Rockin' Robin (Episode 511), Additional Muppets
- Fraggle Rock: Rock On! – Red Fraggle
- Fraggle Rock: Back to the Rock – Red Fraggle, Icy Joe, Queen of the Merggles (puppetry)

=== Film ===
- A Muppet Family Christmas – Red Fraggle, Maureen the Mink
- Dreamchild – Dormouse (puppeteer)
- Labyrinth – Firey 2 (lead puppeteer), The Junk Lady (puppeteer), The Worm (puppeteer), Helping Hands, Goblins (puppetry only)
- Muppet Treasure Island – Additional Muppets
- The Fantastic Miss Piggy Show – Additional Muppets
- The Muppet Christmas Carol – Daughter Mouse, Performer of Ghost of Christmas Past, Aretha
- The Muppets – Additional Muppet Performer
- The Muppets Take Manhattan – Yolanda Rat, Frank the Dog
- The Tale of the Bunny Picnic – Babble Bunny, Baby Bunny, Great-Grandmother Bunny

=== Events ===
- The Muppets Take the Bowl – Additional Muppet Performer (live show at the Hollywood Bowl, 8–10 Sept. 2017)
- The Muppets Take the O2 – Additional Muppet Performer (live show at the O2 Arena, 13–14 Jul. 2018)

== Animator ==
=== Film ===
- Geri's Game
- A Bug's Life
- Toy Story 2 (additional storyboard artist)
- For the Birds
- Monsters, Inc.
- The League of Extraordinary Gentlemen (character animator)
- Son of the Mask
- The Ant Bully (character animator)
- Enchanted (character animator)

=== Video games ===
- Half-Life 2: Episode Two
- Portal
- Team Fortress 2
- Left 4 Dead
- Left 4 Dead 2
- Portal 2 (lead animator on Wheatley and corrupted cores)
- Counter-Strike: Global Offensive
- Half-Life: Alyx
- Aperture Desk Job
