= Jocelyn Stevenson =

British-American writer and producer

Jocelyn Stevenson is a British-American writer and producer, largely for children's shows. She has received the BAFTA Special Award. for her outstanding contributions to children's entertainment. In 2024, Jocelyn released a new middle grade fiction series called The Waterubas.

Stevenson was born in Chicago, United States, and studied psychology at Stanford University, where she developed an interest in child development and education. After graduating, she worked at a daycare centre in California before moving to New York to work for The Children's Television Workshop, the producers of Sesame Street.

She subsequently moved to the United Kingdom where she worked for many years with the Jim Henson Company, contributing to projects including Fraggle Rock, The Tale of the Bunny Picnic and other Henson Productions.

In addition to television work, Stevenson has written children’s books. Her recent work includes The Waterubas, a middle-grade series that explores environmental themes through a fictional storyworld centred on water.

== Screenwriting credits ==
=== Television ===
- Fraggle Rock (1983-1987)
- Sesame Street (1987-1989)
- Charlie Chalk (1988-1989)
- The Ghost of Faffner Hall (1989)
- Captain Zed and the Zee Zone (1991, 1993)
- Funnybones (1992)
- The Legend of Lochnagar (1993)
- Secret Life of Toys (1994)
- Jim Henson’s Animal Show (1994-1997)
- The Magic School Bus (1994-1997)
- Big Bag (1996)
- The Enchanted World of Brambly Hedge (1997-1998)
- Mopatop’s Shop (1999-2005)
- Construction Site (2002)
- Cyberchase (2002)
- Barney & Friends (2002-2006)
- Bob the Builder (2002-2006)
- Rubbadubbers (2003)
- Angelina Ballerina (2003)
- Thomas & Friends (2003-2006)
- Pingu (2003-2006)
- Fireman Sam (2003)
- What’s Your News? (2006-2008)
- Jim Henson’s Frances (2008)
- Care Bears: Welcome to Care-a-Lot (2012)
- The Magic School Bus Rides Again (2017)
- Fraggle Rock: Back to the Rock (2022-2024)

=== Film ===
- The Tale of the Bunny Picnic (1986)
- Silent Mouse (1988)
- Faeries (1999)
- Moshi Monsters: The Movie (2013)
- The Magic School Bus Rides Again: In The Zone (2020)
