= Philip Balsam =

Canadian songwriter, composer and author (1943–2023)

Philip Balsam (23 December 1943 – 31 March 2023) was a Canadian songwriter, composer, and author. Many of his musical works were created for television or theatre, in collaboration with a lyricist. He is best known for his work on the show Fraggle Rock.

== Career ==
With fellow Canadian Dennis Lee, Balsam wrote about 190 songs for the television series Fraggle Rock; a few more songs were written with author Tim Wynne-Jones. The songs were sung by puppets on the show; some of them were released as an album, Fraggle Rock: Music and Magic, in 1993.

A second album, Jim Henson's Muppets Present Fraggle Rock, released in 1984, was produced by Balsam and Don Gillis. The album was nominated for a Grammy Award, which it won jointly with Shel Silverstein's Where the Sidewalk Ends. The show's theme song, written by Balsam and Lee, appeared on the Top 40 chart in the United Kingdom.

Fraggle Rock was aired around the world, and in 1989 was the first North American television show to be broadcast in the Soviet Union. Balsam performed the voice of the character Phil Fraggle on the show.

Balsam and Lee also wrote the songs for the Jim Henson television special "The Tale of the Bunny Picnic" and film Dog City. They wrote songs for the musical theatre version of Mordecai Richler's Jacob Two-Two and the Hooded Fang. and Jacob Two-Two and the Dinosaur.

== Death ==
Balsam died on 31 March 2023, at the age of 79 from complications of giant cell arteritis.
