= GBR TV =

- Country: Italy
- Broadcast area: Rome

Programming
- Language: Italian
- Picture format: 4:3 SDTV

History
- Launched: 1 August 1976

Availability

Terrestrial
- Rome: UHF channels 33 and 47

GBR TV was an Italian television station based in Rome.

Born as a radio station in 1974, it rose to national prominence in 1978 when, beating even RAI, it was the only media outlet to broadcast live the phases of the discovery of Aldo Moro's body at the end of his 55 days of imprisonment.

That legacy made it one of the most important private television stations in the capital and perhaps in Italy, a position consolidated also thanks to the political closeness of the various owners with the parties in government at the time (in particular the Socialist Party in the 1980s), which guaranteed the programming presenters and guests of great notoriety and advertising appeal.

With the advent of the Mani pulite investigation of 1992-93 and the arrest of numerous entrepreneurs and financiers close to the Christian Democratic and Socialist areas, the economic resources of the various media subsidized by them also disappeared, including GBR itself, which consequently underwent a drastic downsizing. Declared bankrupt in 1996, it was reborn with mixed success on a satellite platform in 2002 without ever experiencing the success of its first golden decade, and in 2013 it definitively ceased its activity.

GBR was responsible for the emergence of figures who subsequently gained notoriety in the large national television networks, such as Franco Alfano in journalism and Milly Carlucci and Gianni Ippoliti in entertainment.

== History ==
=== Early years ===
The original nucleus of the future television station saw the light in 1974 as a radio station under the initiative of Giovanni "Gianni" Del Piano, an entrepreneur who owned a consumer electronics business in Rome (TeleStore, in via del Tritone) as well as the owner of the relay stations which spread the signals of Telemontecarlo and Televisione Svizzera Italiana in Lazio from Monte Cavo. There is no univocal version regarding the origin of the GBR acronym: some sources attribute it to the initials of the names of Gianni Del Piano and his - at the time - wife, Bianca (Gianni + Bianca + Radio), while others accredit it to the English initials of the colors of the logo (Green, Blue & Red); l'Unità even attributed it to the Italian acronyms of "yellow, blue and red". (Note: Even though yellow was not part of the logo) The offices of the newly formed station were in Largo del Nazareno, where the registered office of Del Piano's commercial company was already located.

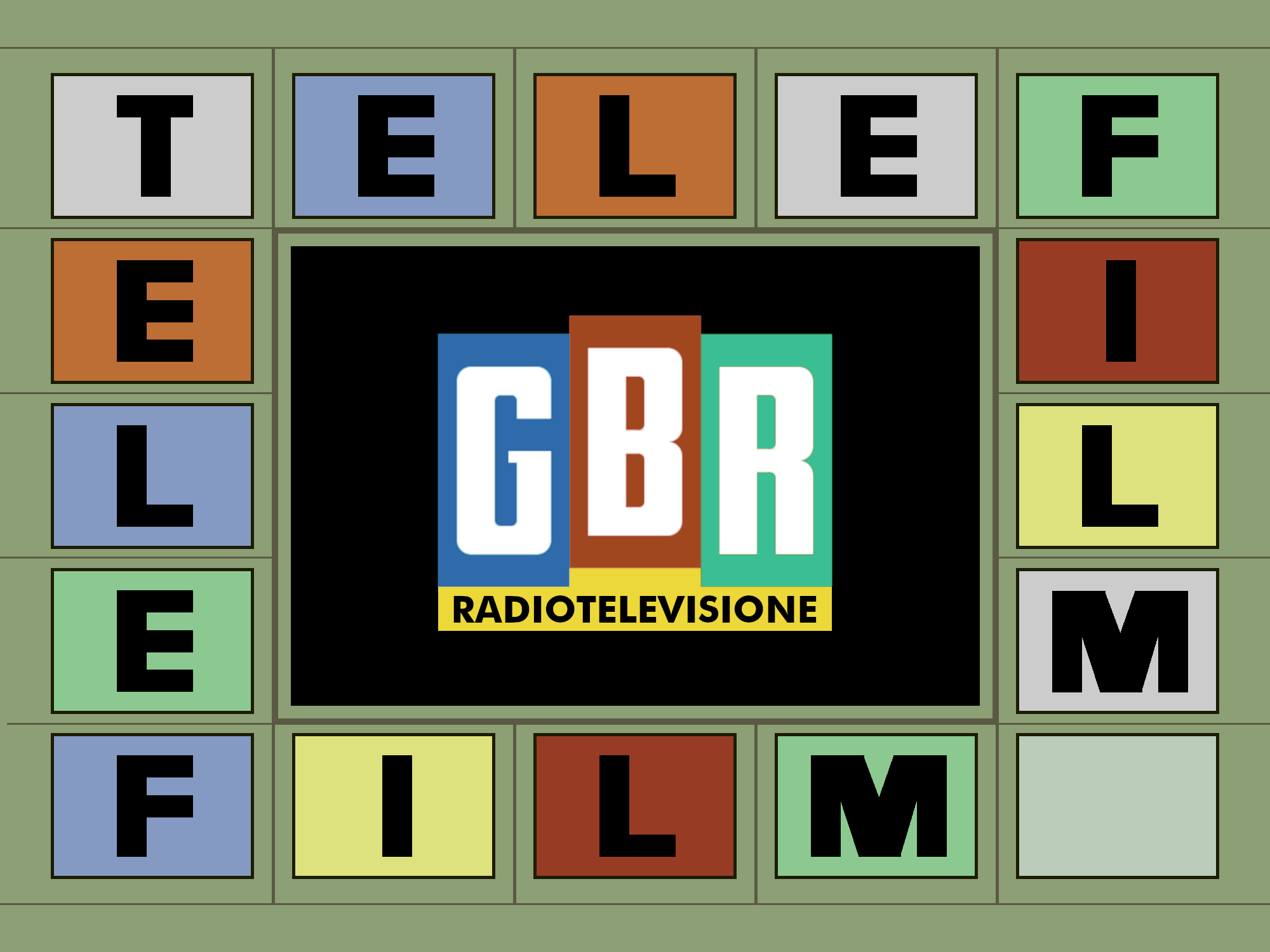
GBR TV slide used before TV series in its early years

GBR Radio broadcast on FM 102.5 Mhz from the top floor of the Hôtel Cavalieri Hilton in Monte Mario and made use of the collaboration of Ugo Porcelli, a RAI radio personality at the time, to recruit new voices who established themselves as entertainers and disc jockeys, including Federico Biagione, Milly Carlucci, Viviana Antonini and others. Already in 1976, however, Del Piano had oriented himself towards the more profitable television station, while the radio outlet - in the meantime renamed Antenna Italia - which, directed by Marcello Casco, had started syndication initiatives with various national operators including the Marcucci family (Elefante TV and later Videomusic), was gradually abandoned and effectively decommissioned at the beginning of the eighties. In 1982, the frequency was sold to Radio Radicale which, transmitting on 102.2, took the opportunity to unify the transmissions on 102.4 MHz on which it still broadcasts.

GBR TV, announced in July 1976 as Telestore Videocolor Service from the name of Del Piano's business and credited as the first privately owned color television station, (Note: At the time of the news, the launch dates of PTS, which began broadcasting on 27 July, and Teleroma 56, inaugurated on 29 July, were not known; GBR was actually the third station to be launched in a week.) began broadcasting on 1 August. It stood in a multifunctional structure called Spazio Parco at number 8062 in via Trionfale - near the fort of the same name - which housed, in addition to the ephemeral radio, also the recording studios for use by other radio and television broadcasters of the Marcucci group, owner of the area, and became the production center for its own news program (the Video Giornale), whose guide was called a young Franco Alfano who was one of the people who contributed to the network's notoriety even beyond the city sphere.

In 1977 GBR was the object of commercial interest by the pro-Christian Democratic entrepreneur Gaetano Rebecchini (according to the journalist Vito Di Dario the interest materialized with the entry into the property), who also boasted a mayor of Rome in his family branch, as the station showed ideological closeness to the largest government party of the time. Although the newborn station, not unlike many of its sisters in the local television airwaves, not only in Rome, had made a name for itself through the use of erotic night-time programming - broadcast after the end time of programs of films forbidden to minors under 18 when not directly self-produced striptease shows were regularly subject to complaint and judicial censure for outraging public decency - at a later stage the station distance itself from the cliché of a private station seeking notoriety only through the negative publicity of its erotic scandals. Nonetheless, still in 1978, a hatha yoga program was aired - admittedly not very credible in the eyes of enthusiasts of the discipline - in which a young topless student performed the positions ordered by a master with clear Nordic or Anglo-Saxon features and a foreign accent.

On the generalist front, however, the schedule presented a mix of young promises such as Viviana Antonini alongside well-known artists such as Franco Latini, with her involved in an entertainment show aimed at children; Michele Gammino, host of a video quiz; Maurizio Arena, owner of a periodical column. Relatively recent productions that Rai no longer broadcast also appeared in the schedule, such as the well-known American television series My Friend Tony.

=== The Via Caetani scoop ===
GBR's leap in quality occurred in conjunction with the last moments of one of the darkest episodes in the history of the Republic, the kidnapping and assassination of Aldo Moro, president of the Christian Democrats at the time, by the Red Brigades.

Around midday on 9 May 1978, Video Giornale director Franco Alfano was alerted by telephone by his colleague Giorgio Laskaraky from Il Tempo of the presence of a suspicious vehicle and bomb squad in via Michelangelo Caetani, a street in the center of Rome near Largo di Torre Argentina and a side street of via delle Botteghe Oscure, the headquarters of the then Italian Communist Party. Alfano hurriedly went to the scene, arranging, via the radio telephone with which his car was equipped, to open the live television broadcast and to have a cameraman on site. Once he reached via Caetani he managed to force the first security cordon made up of financiers, while even Paolo Frajese's RAI crew arrived too late to approach. Once he passed he found Valerio Leccese - the closest of the camera operators to intervene - with whom he entered a building and went up to the first floor, convincing the doorman not to send them away and gaining a privileged observation point through a window overlooking the scene of the bomb squad who were working on the Renault 4 in whose trunk the body of Aldo Moro actually turned out to be found. Leccese began filming, documenting all the operations of discovery and identification of the body while Alfano transmitted the chronicle of the events by voice.

Bruno Vespa later wrote that he considered it "a strong professional slap" to have been beaten to the punch by a local television. Alfano said that that same evening he had received compliments from Frajese for the scoop, who however on the occasion declared himself not convinced that the doorman in via Caetani had allowed the GBR crew access to the building without obtaining any compensation. Alfano himself, a year later, joined Rai and became deputy director of TG2 and general director of San Marino TV.

Not having its own service, Rai asked for the video recording of the live broadcast, which GBR granted to it free of charge with the only condition that the image of its logo remained clearly visible, at the bottom right, which was then broadcast on all the state broadcaster's news programs, giving the network national notoriety.

The sociologist Fausto Colombo, in his 2012 work Il paese leggero, identifies this episode as a watershed in the history of mass communication in Italy, i.e. the definitive transition from bureaucratic and institutional information linked to a few officially recognized centers - RAI, the major press, typical of the pre-reform scenario of 1975 in which control over television broadcasting was governmental and not parliamentary - to a direct one whose production is competitive, no longer required to submit to rights of primogeniture of pre-existing subjects: from that moment on, the first to break the news regardless of his rank and past would win the information race.

=== The golden period ===
In the very early 1980s, Del Piano resumed contact with the Marcuccis, who in the meantime had launched Elefante, a syndication project owned by Tele Urbe in the capital, and who were planning the creation of the first national platform with content provided directly by the individual consortium of television stations through their new Canale 2000 brand, launched in 1982. GBR, with its two historic UHF channels, 33 (Monte Mario) and 47 (Monte Guadagnolo), was part of this consortium and in the intentions of the Marcuccis and Del Piano the Roman broadcaster should have been one of the most important of the new channel, so much so that it was hypothesized that this, when fully operational, should have taken the name of GBR Canale 2000. However, the project ended in nothing and on 31 March 1984 it was definitively abandoned with the closure of Canale 2000 and the birth, on those same frequencies, of Videomusic from an idea of the young Marcucci heir, Marialina.

At that point, Del Piano had completely lost involvement with the station, which also abandoned the headquarters in via Trionfale to downsize to smaller premises near via Veneto and faced a financial crisis resolved by the intervention of Vincenzo Balzamo, treasurer of the Socialist Party, who took over GBR to sell it to Cine TV Roma Srl, a company close to the PSI. The new ownership installed the Roman Ania Pieroni, who had been romantically linked to Bettino Craxi as the director of the channel for a few years. The new director moved the television headquarters to Parioli, in via Panama 11, in the immediate vicinity of Piazza Unità, and, as requested, managed to design a high-profile program ensuring reliable presenters: Gianni Ippoliti, for example, created and hosted an ante-litteram talent show for the network, Provini, which a few years later he brought to Rai with the same name.

Furthermore, taking advantage of the fact of coming from a Roman bourgeoisie family, Pieroni managed to bring into the studio, often without compensation, well-known names of society and culture such as the architect Paolo Portoghesi and his wife Giovanna Massobrio, to whom he entrusted the management of a television salon together with Marta Marzotto (L'Italia di Marta Marzotto) in which personalities such as Adelina Tattilo (publisher of Playboy in Italian), Lina Sotis, and Dario Beauty participated, and even unlikely names like Enrico Manca, president of Rai at the time, or of a competing company whose employees were prohibited (by order of Manca himself) from accepting invitations to appear on other broadcasting companies without permission. Other names destined for notoriety in their respective professional sectors include Monica Leofreddi, editor of a sports column, the psychologist Maria Rita Parsi, the future Rai journalist Alda D'Eusanio, the presenter Enrico Papi; this assortment of personalities and variety of programs meant that GBR became the first private Roman television in terms of audience.

The entry into the Cinquestelle syndication network in 1988 also contributed to ensuring the circulation of programs throughout the peninsula, which guaranteed a centralization of advertising revenues through Sipra and the exploitation of part of the Rai repertoire through Sacis.

=== Bankruptcy ===
The economic situation of GBR began to cause alarm when Ania Pieroni entered into a relationship with Osman Mancini, PSI trustee in the network and director of the news, in 1991; Craxi forced Mancini to resign from GBR, bypassing Pieroni, who had refused to fire him, and opposed his return to television despite her threat to permanently interrupt the relationship with the socialist leader, which happened.

What seemed like only a sentimental diatribe actually hid the beginning of GBR's decline: shortly thereafter it was discovered that the station's accounts, despite the large advertising revenues, were in the red by around six and a half billion lire at the time (around 3.3 million euros). In fact, in 1995 it became known that the network — without the knowledge of Pieroni who only dealt with the artistic and advertising part but not with the administrative one, on the margins of which it had been kept — was in fact a financing center through triangulations made with other television networks or providers of services and programs and, when the judicial case which became known as Clean Hands exploded, which involved practically almost all the government parties of the last twenty-five years, in particular DC and PSI, GBR ended up in the investigation as the CEO of Cine TV Roma, Giorgio Tradati, Craxi's frontman in the management of two bank accounts in Switzerland, declared that the direct management of the broadcaster was in fact the responsibility of the former secretary.

In 1993, GBR was up for sale at auction and the American television network Trinity Broadcasting Network of Paul Crouch, a Pentecostal televangelist of the American Assemblies of God, came forward among the buyers, but the deal was not concluded, because at the beginning of 1995 the purchaser of Cine TV Roma with GBR in tow was Teleinvest of Gustavo Spangenberg, an Italian-Uruguayan entrepreneur, and his wife Elisa Marincola di San Floro, journalist who took over the editorship of the newspaper; at the first board of directors held in December of that year, the first results of the relaunch plan were presented, which included, in addition to the renewal of equipment and studios, also contracts with the presidents of Lazio Sergio Cragnotti and Roma Franco Sensi for the local exclusivity (in full deferred) of their teams' matches. Furthermore, from April 1995, the network's audience data were collected by Auditel.

TBN, which two years earlier had remained out of the sale, entered into a partnership with Teleinvest, exchanging minority shares of Cine TV Roma with it and allowing it to take ownership of some television stations that the Christian network held in Lombardy and Piedmont. In exchange, the American broadcaster landed on GBR with a religious column in Italian, Per lodare te.

In that part of the season GBR had produced some sports programs on its own such as Domenica tutto goal with Marco Liorni and Cristina Bianchino and had exclusively for Italy some television productions of South American football, Argentine Futbol, Campeonato Carioca and Uruguayan Futbol, hosted by Massimiliano Arrichiello, also a commentator of Lazio matches for the broadcaster. As for entertainment, it was the first to broadcast the shōnen manga Ranma ½ in a censored version in Italy, and inherited the WWF Superstars broadcast from Italia 1.

The news of bankruptcy issued on 7 March 1996 by the court of Rome therefore arrived unexpectedly: the judge had accepted the request by INPS for failure to pay approximately 170 million in contributions to Cine TV Roma[31] where he had granted an extension a few weeks earlier for a leasing contract with BNL. At the time of the bankruptcy declaration, GBR's audience, certified by Auditel, had risen to second place among local television stations in the region, with an increase of 72% in the last eight months of 1995. Following the bankruptcy, the license to occupy the frequencies was withdrawn, and the ownership of Cine TV Roma (at that date composed of 55% by Teleinvest and the remaining 45% by Trinity Broadcasting) first attempted to request the blocking of this revocation in order to maintain the market value of television; a negotiation with Sergio Cragnotti and Franco Sensi for the joint purchase of the network, believed to become a sort of official channel for the clubs they preside over, now seemed to be well advanced but did not materialize.

In July, four months after the bankruptcy ruling, the Lazio Regional Administrative Court blocked the revocation of the broadcasting license and this gave Spangenberg time to look for new capital that could cope with the debt of around 7 billion lire: among the subjects most likely to enter the ownership of GBR were Francesco Di Stefano (TVR Voxson and subsequently Europa 7) and Roberto Petrassi, at the time a minority shareholder of the Caltagirone group's TV station Teleregione, but even these alleged expressions of interest remained without follow-up.

The suspension had no effect and the bankruptcy sentence ran its course; the reassignment of the frequencies left free by GBR was also the subject of a parliamentary question in 1997 to the then communications minister Antonio Maccanico as they were still unavailable to other parties who had requested them.

=== Return and definitive closure ===
Once the GBR brand no longer existed in the airwaves by decision of the judges, the publisher Mariano Amici used it to rename his channel Europa TV and, subsequently, to name a later channel, GBR 2. At the beginning of the millennium, the legitimate brand was taken over from bankruptcy by Edoardo Caltagirone, brother of the manufacturer Francesco Gaetano, through the company Sidis Vision, already owner of two other television stations, T9 (new name of the already mentioned Teleregione) and Teleroma 56. Caltagirone forced the Amici group, through a cease and desist, to abandon the GBR brand; the two stations of the rival group GBR and GBR 2 became SuperNova and Canale Zero respectively; in the last years of its stay on analog terrestrial, the aforementioned SuperNova occupied UHF channel 47 already of the historical GBR.

The revived GBR brand appeared for about 2 years in coexistence with that of Teleroma 56 on the latter's broadcasts and then migrated to Eutelsat's Hot Bird 6 satellite. From channel 877 of the Sky Italia bouquet, GBR Sat aired a selection of programs from the two sister stations. On December 24, 2013, the station stopped broadcasting; a few months later Sidis Vision also put T9 into liquidation.

In 2015, the independent Roman director Luca Rea made Liberi tutti, a documentary film on the dawn of private television broadcasting in Italy; the incipit of this work cites the aforementioned hatha yoga lessons broadcast by GBR, a broadcaster to which homage is paid later in the documentary with nine minutes of film by Alfano and Leccese on the discovery of Aldo Moro. Liberi tutti was presented at the tenth Rome Film Festival.
