= The Ghost of Faffner Hall =

British-American children's television series

- Also known as: Jim Henson's Ghost of Faffner Hall
- Directed by: Tony Kysh
- Starring: Louise Gold; Richard Hunt; Karen Prell; Mike Quinn; Mak Wilson
- Countries of origin: United Kingdom; United States
- No. of seasons: 1
- No. of episodes: 13

Production
- Executive producer: Jim Henson
- Production companies: Jim Henson Productions; Tyne Tees Television

Original release
- Network: ITV (UK)
- Release: August 16 – November 8, 1989

The Ghost of Faffner Hall is a musical children's television series from Jim Henson Productions and the British ITV company Tyne Tees Television which aired from August 16, 1989 to November 11, 1989 in the UK, and slightly later in the US. The puppets for this show were created by Jim Henson's Creature Shop, and the series was recorded at the Tyne Tees Studios in Newcastle upon Tyne and directed by Tony Kysh, then senior director within that company's children's department.

== Plot ==
Faffner Hall is a music conservatory that was founded by Fughetta Faffner. When Fughetta Faffner passes away, her ghost lurks in Faffner Hall and it is currently run by her great-great-grandnephew Farkus Faffner who hates music. Now, Fughetta must thwart Farkus' plans with the help of Mimi, Riff, and the Wild Impresario. During this time, they meet up with the famous musicians that visit Faffner Hall.

== Characters ==
=== Main characters ===
- Fughetta Faffner (performed by Louise Gold) - The main protagonist of the series. She is the founder of Faffner Hall. When she dies, her ghost haunts the halls and ends up having to prevent her great-great-grandnephew Farkus from destroying the halls. Whenever Fughetta hears beautiful music, she ends up solidifying. Fughetta also has the ability to freeze time so that she can fix things in the present.
- Mimi (performed by Karen Prell) - A girl with a Southern accent who is one of the inhabitants of Faffner Hall.
- Riff (performed by Mike Quinn) - A boy who is one of the inhabitants of Faffner Hall. He serves as a second banana to Mimi.
- The Wild Impresario (performed by Richard Hunt) - He is one of the inhabitants of Faffner Hall and the resident piano player.
- Farkus Faffner (performed by Mak Wilson) - The main antagonist of the series who is the current proprietor of Faffner Hall. He is the great-great-grandnephew of Fughetta Faffner who hates music and only cares about money. Farkus has since been making various plans to drive Faffner Hall's inhabitants from Faffner Hall which go horribly awry.
- Faffner Hall Composer Busts - They are the busts of Ludwig van Beethoven, Wolfgang Amadeus Mozart, and George Frideric Handel. When Fughetta Faffner freezes time, she ends up having to consult with them in order to handle a specific situation.

=== Guest characters ===
- Great Uncle Fishknife - Fughetta Faffner's uncle who appeared in "Music Brings Us Together" to help Mimi, Riff, and Wild Impresario get Fughetta Faffner intangible after Farkus found a way to trap her in solid form.

== Episodes ==
No.	Title	Directed by	Written by	Original release date
1	"Your Body Is an Instrument"	Tony Kysh	Jocelyn Stevenson & Patrick Barlow	August 16, 1989
Farkus Faffner plans to auction off Faffner Hall's collection of musical instruments. The late Fughetta Faffner, a distant relative of Farkas and the founder of the hall, is horrified when she learns of Farkas' plans. The residents of the hall, including Riff, Mimi, the Wild Impresario and the ghost of Fughetta, attempt to teach Farkas that instruments are worth more than their monetary value. Guest Spot: Bobby McFerrin shows that he can express himself using his body. Double bass player Gary Karr and trumpet player Håkan Hardenberger also appear.
2	"Delighting in Sounds"	Tony Kysh	David Angus & Patrick Barlow	August 23, 1989
Faffner Hall is holding a "Festival of Sounds", and the Wild Impresario is trying to find a sound to top the bill. He gets a note in the mail from his old girlfriend Zola of his from his days in the Wild Bunch. Zola says in her note that she is coming to see Wild. Meanwhile, Farkus Faffner plans to blow up Faffner Hall where he will blame its residents and claim the insurance money. Guest Spot: Nigel Kennedy and Joni Mitchell appear where Joni mentioned that she once dated the Wild Impresario
3	"Sound Becomes Music"	Tony Kysh	David Angus & Patrick Barlow	August 30, 1989
When an infant alien lands in Faffner Hall, Farkus comes up with a plan to become rich while Fughetta and Mimi discover that the alien needs music. Guest Spot: Riff whistles a riff of his own, then explains where he got it from: a dream he had which includes Mark Knopfler, George Martin, Paddy Moloney and an orchestra of The Frackles playing the tune he whistled as he heard a teakettle. While composing her song, Mimi encounters a wizard named Fish (played by Derek William Dick) to play the melody that she created.
4	"Music Is More Than Technique"	Tony Kysh	David Angus & Patrick Barlow	September 6, 1989
Mimi informs Riff that the violinist virtuoso Piganini has booked a recording studio in town and plan to ask him to perform at Faffner Hall. Guest Spot: While hiding in the closet, Piganini encounters a janitor that Piganini claims to resemble Ry Cooder. The janitor gives Piganini the courage to overcome his stage fright and perform at Faffner Hall.
5	"The Voice Is an Instrument"	Tony Kysh	Jocelyn Stevenson & Patrick Barlow	September 13, 1989
Farkus Faffner enlists a zookeeper as his business partner where he sells Faffner Hall to the zookeeper so that he can turn it into a zoo. Guest Spot: Back when Faffner Hall was at its peak, Fughetta Faffner recalls when she played a maid in a Spanish opera with Thomas Allen. The Faffner Hall Composer Busts recall to Fughetta about an a capella group they heard on the radio recently called the Electric Phoenix who use their voices as instruments (one of the members even does an imitation of Miss Piggy). Wild Impresario brings up the fact that Marion Montgomery was one of his old friends and was accompanied on the piano by Joseph the Tiger (a recycled version of Butch the Tiger).
6	"Reacting to Sounds"	Tony Kysh	Jocelyn Stevenson & Patrick Barlow	September 20, 1989
Fughetta Faffner does her half-century sound check around Faffner Hall where she must make sure that there is one ghost in Faffner Hall according to Page 17 Paragraph 4C of the "Rules of the Dead." Fughetta soon starts to hear the voice of J.J. Ready (who invented the cash register in 1877) Guest Spots: During Fughetta's sound check, the ghostly sounds that Fughetta, Mimi, and Riff here have been coming from H.K. Gruber and his orchestra and the trumpet of Dizzy Gillespie.
7	"If You Can Play, It's an Instrument"	Tony Kysh	David Angus & Patrick Barlow	September 27, 1989
Mimi discovers that a guy had broken the obo record by playing the longest note while on a tightrope. The original record holder was Fughetta's cousin Finkel back in 1853. Meanwhile, Farkus Faffner plans to use the instruments as scrap metal. Guest Spot: In his quest for junk, Farkas asks the Wild Impresario to show him something about music, so Wild shows him a tape with The Scottish Chamber Orchestra that demonstrates the instruments they play. A saxophone salesman (played by Courtney Pine) comes to Faffner Hall.
8	"Improvised Music"	Tony Kysh	Jocelyn Stevenson & Patrick Barlow	October 4, 1989
A TV crew is coming to Faffner Hall for a special on the building; the regular residents hope it makes for good publicity. However, Farkas Faffner has another scheme: he wants to turn the hall into an amusement park! Guest Spot: Gil Evans Orchestra and Ladysmith Black Mambazo appear.
9	"Notation: The Sign That Gets the Sound"	Tony Kysh	David Angus & Patrick Barlow	October 11, 1989
Guest Spot: James Taylor performs with the Wild Impresario.
10	"Discovering New Sounds"	Tony Kysh	David Angus & Patrick Barlow	October 18, 1989
Guest Spot: Thomas Dolby demonstrates the sounds that you can make with a synthesizer. Patrick Moraz is the other musical guest.
11	"Music Brings Us Together"	Tony Kysh	Jocelyn Stevenson & Patrick Barlow	October 25, 1989
Using a talking skull (a recycled version of Yorick the Skull from The Muppet Show), Farkus Faffner traps Fughetta Faffner in her solidified state and traps her as part of his haunted house plot. Mimi, Riff, and Wild Impresario end up summoning Fughetta's Great Uncle Fishknife for help. Guest Spot: Guest musician Youssou N'Dour shows Fughetta how to communicate with music despite language barriers. Steve Turre plays on seashells with a tourist family of dragons, and Yomo Toro plays his guitar. Note: David Rudman gives an uncredited performance as the dragon son (played by Earl the Dragon) in the segment with Steve Turre.
12	"The Power of Music"	Tony Kysh	Jocelyn Stevenson & Patrick Barlow	November 1, 1989
A ghost exterminator named Madame Mumu (a recycled version of the Geri and the Atrics piano player from The Muppet Show) arrives at Faffner Hall where Farkus enlists her to get rid of Fughetta at the time when Farkus has a cold. Guest Spot: Madame Mumu comes across the room where Los Lobos is performing where Cesar Rosas is finding it hard to adjust to the upbeat mood of the music ever since his girlfriend left him.
13	"Anyone Can Make Music"	Tony Kysh	David Angus & Patrick Barlow	November 8, 1989
lt's time for the 103rd Annual Fughetta Faffner Memorial Concert, and it's also time to pay Farkas Faffner his rent. No one has the money, so Farkas puts everyone to work and the memorial concert is canceled. Will the rent be paid on time to save the concert or will Farkas have a change of heart? Guest Spot: Michala Petri and Robin Williamson appear in this episode.

== Cast ==
=== Muppet performers ===
- Richard Coombs as Ray (ep. 2), Piganini (ep. 4), Zookeeper (ep. 5), Mr. Director (ep. 8), Madame Mumu (ep. 12)
- Louise Gold as Fughetta Faffner, Mean Mama (ep. 7)
- Richard Hunt as The Wild Impresario
- Phil Knowles
- Angie Passmore as Zola (ep. 2), Tutie (ep. 2)
- Karen Prell as Mimi
- David Rudman as Dragon Son (ep. 11, uncredited)
- Mike Quinn as Riff
- Bob Smeaton
- Mak Wilson as Farkas Faffner

=== Special musical guests ===
- Thomas Allen as himself
- Ry Cooder as Janitor
- Derek William Dick as Fish the Wizard
- Thomas Dolby as himself
- Julia Fordham as herself
- Dizzy Gillespie as himself
- H.K. Gruber as himself
- Håkan Hardenberger as himself
- Gary Karr as himself
- Mark Knopfler as himself
- Nigel Kennedy as himself
- Los Lobos as Themselves
- Paddy Moloney as himself
- George Martin as himself
- Ladysmith Black Mambazo as Themselves
- Bobby McFerrin as himself
- Joni Mitchell as herself
- Marion Montgomery as herself
- Patrick Moraz as himself
- Youssou N'Dour as himself
- Gil Evans Orchestra as Themselves
- Michala Petri as herself
- Electric Phoenix as Themselves
- Courtney Pine as Saxophone Salesman
- Como String Quartet as Peter Bucknell, Hung Le, Peter O'Reilly, Glen Nichols and George Vi
- James Taylor as himself
- Yomo Toro as himself
- Steve Turre as himself
- Robin Williamson as himself
- David Sawyer as himself

== Critical reception ==
Alan Carter of People magazine lamented the absence of classic Muppets characters but otherwise gave the show a brief but favorable review: "This one sings."

== See also ==
- List of ghost films
