= Ludo (Labyrinth) =

Fictional character

- First appearance: Labyrinth (1986)
- Created by: Jim Henson; Brian Froud
- Designed by: Brian Froud
- Portrayed by: Ron Mueck; Rob Mills
- Voiced by: Ron Mueck

In-universe information
- Species: Beast
- Gender: Male

Ludo is a fictional character in the 1986 fantasy film Labyrinth. A large, gentle beast befriended by protagonist Sarah Williams, Ludo was designed by Brian Froud and performed as an animatronic puppet built, puppeteered and voiced by Ron Mueck. The character received a positive response from entertainment critics.

== Development ==
Labyrinth started as a collaboration between director Jim Henson and conceptual designer Brian Froud following their previous collaboration, The Dark Crystal. In making Labyrinth, Henson wanted to create a film that combined elements of fairy tales and classical stories in a script that would appeal to a modern audience. Unlike The Dark Crystal, which had featured only puppets, Henson and Froud wanted Labyrinth to include interactions between puppet creatures and human characters, "almost like a throwback to the original Muppet Show", with a greater focus on characters' personalities and relationships. Ludo was created in the Muppets' tradition of large, friendly monsters, though in a style closer to Froud's own "highly organic and realistic" work. Froud stated that the character is a combination of various creatures from folklore: part yeti, part Bigfoot and part troll. Ludo's ability to commune with nature by summoning rocks came from Henson's deep "belie[f] in connection with the world", according to Froud.

"We decided we wanted a nice big creature and we thought it might be a challenge to come up with a fresh new side. Since the muppets have been used to create so many monsters, we decided to reinvent it, and hopefully, that's what we did. Ludo was a problem to build. It took a long time to make something that large fluid and believable. We certainly pushed the technical techniques further than has ever been done before in terms of making it believable."

— Conceptual designer Brian Froud to American Cinematographer.

As with all of the creature characters in Labyrinth, Ludo was performed through puppetry and animatronics produced by Jim Henson's Creature Shop. Ron Mueck, Ludo's main operator, sculpted, molded and fabricated Ludo, including devising a harness and "skeleton" for the costume. As a suit to be worn by one performer, the Ludo costume had to be made as lightweight as possible. Halfway through its build, it was determined to be too heavy and had to be rebuilt with lighter materials. The final costume weighed 75 pounds and was 9 feet in height. The thighs and forearms were constructed out of Kevlar shells. Ludo's fur was created on knitting machines by Val Jones, Cass Willing and Lesja Liber, from henna-red wool and sisal.

Ludo was performed primarily by Mueck, with Rob Mills as the character's alternate puppeteer inside the costume. The performer would have one arm in one of Ludo's arms and the other hand in Ludo's head to perform the mouth like a hand puppet. Inside the costume were two television monitors, one showing what the film camera saw and another showing the performer where he was going via a tiny camera mounted in Ludo's horn. Outside, three puppeteers controlled Ludo's facial expressions via remote radio control; Francis Wright worked the eyebrows, Sue Dacre the eyeballs and eyelids, and Don Austen the lip movements, lip-syncing with Mueck.

== In Labyrinth ==
Ludo is introduced when Sarah finds him bound and tormented by goblins in the Labyrinth. After scaring the goblins away by throwing stones at them, Sarah releases Ludo and calms him, and he joins her quest to retrieve her baby brother from King Jareth's castle. They encounter talking door knockers and enter a forest, but Ludo falls through a trap door, separating them.

He later reunites with Sarah and Hoggle at the Bog of Eternal Stench. Ludo defeats Sir Didymus, who guards the bridge over the Bog, in a brief fight, earning his respect and brotherhood. When the bridge collapses under Sarah, Ludo uses his power to summon rocks, helping the group escape the Bog.

Ludo and Sir Didymus later rescue Sarah from a junk yard and accompany her toward the Goblin City, where Hoggle rejoins them. In the ensuing battle, Ludo's strength and ability to summon rocks help clear a path through Jareth's goblin army.

Once Sarah defeats Jareth and returns home with her brother, Ludo is among the friends from the Labyrinth who return to celebrate with her after assuring her that they will be there for her whenever she should need them.

== Characterisation and themes ==
Richard Martin of the Ottawa Citizen noted that Ludo resembles the minotaur at the heart of the labyrinth in Greek mythology. Noting the influence of The Wizard of Oz on Labyrinth, academic Donna R. White observed that Sarah encounters Ludo, her second companion in the Labyrinth, in a parallel fashion to Dorothy Gale finding the Tin Woodman; she hears him before she sees him and must rescue him from a predicament. Joe Pollack of the St. Louis Post-Dispatch identified Sarah's rescue of Ludo, "a shaggy behemoth", as a retelling of the fable "The Lion and the Mouse".

Despite his intimidating size and appearance with horns and protruding fangs, Ludo is gentle and sweet-natured with "a soul of pure mush" and wants most of all for some kind-hearted people to be his friends. The Mary Sue's Sara Godwin wrote that Ludo's victimization by the goblins "is a reminder that bad things happen even to the strongest people" and the character demonstrates the power of friendship. Likening Ludo to Ferdinand the Bull, Sarah Monette of Uncanny Magazine wrote that the character "is the necessary proof that the world of the imagination is not innately bad ... Ludo's friendship is unconditional; he is both protective older sibling and hero–worshipping younger sibling". Terry Lawson of the Dayton Daily News identified Ludo as "a first cousin" to the Cowardly Lion; he is afraid upon entering the forest and needs Sarah's reassurance.

Ludo is read by literary scholars as representing compassion and loyalty, supporting Sarah's security and maturation in her journey through the Labyrinth. With Ludo, Sarah discovers the value of teamwork, and Sam Karnick in Chronicles wrote that the character's rock-calling ability demonstrates the power of nature. Like many of the characters Sarah meets on her adventure, Ludo is represented in one of the toys shown in her bedroom at the start of the film.

== Reception ==
Ludo was brought to support Labyrinth's Royal Charity premiere at the London Film Festival on 1 December 1986, with Charles, Prince of Wales and Diana, Princess of Wales in attendance. Princess Diana's picture with Ludo appeared in newspapers across the United Kingdom and an article that appeared in The Sun quoted her as remarking "isn't he wonderful!" upon being introduced to the character.

Ludo received a generally positive response from entertainment critics, who enjoyed his sweet, gentle nature and relationship with Sarah. "Ludo is a big lug of a monster; he's as slow mentally as he is physically, but he's as lovable as can be," wrote David Connelly in the Shreveport Journal. Amy Ratcliffe of Nerdist wrote that Labyrinth is "full of lovable characters, but maybe none more so than Ludo." Describing Ludo as "8-foot-tall ... orangutan-furred and, of course, marshmallow-sweet and soft inside", Sheila Benson of The Los Angeles Times considered him to be the most original character among Sarah's companions. ""Friend?" asks Ludo, who sounds in dire need of one. You'll want to hug the beast," penned Odie Henderson in Slant, naming Ludo as his favourite character in the film. The Mary Sue's Sara Godwin called Sarah's rescue of Ludo and his declaration of her as his friend "one of the damn sweetest scenes in a movie ever." Describing him as "an eight-foot ball of slow-moving fur", Associated Press writer Bob Thomas considered Ludo to be the film's most endearing creature character. Similarly, Joseph Gelmis of Newsday called the "sweetly goofy Ludo" one of the "best things about Labyrinth". Expressing that she loved Ludo "more than pretty much anything ever", Sarah Monette of Uncanny Magazine wrote that he "absolutely hits all the buttons of anyone who was a lonely, bullied child."

Several reviewers remarked that Ludo resembles a monster from Where the Wild Things Are, the character Chewbacca from Star Wars, as well as Muppets such as Thog, Sweetums and Snufflupagus. Time's Richard Corliss described Ludo as "an orange-haired hybrid of a buffalo and a gorilla, who walks like Charles Laughton's Hunchback of Notre Dame and talks like Grover on Sesame Street." Stating that Labyrinth's creatures sit "right at the nexus of hideous and incredibly cute", Tyler Dean of Reactor described Ludo as "a delightful mixture of orangutan and giant ground sloth who looks like a distant cousin of a Balrog run through a kawaii Snapchat filter."

Ludo's puppetry received praise, with Witney Seibold of Slash Film writing that Mueck "g[a]ve Ludo's voice and body a believable heft. Indeed, Ludo may be the best puppet in the film." Praising the "sense of craft" in Labyrinth's worldbuilding and its "studied, unique, and intimate design and physical work", Chris Cabin of Collider wrote, "Just seeing Ludo walk so seamlessly across the rocks feels like a rare kind of visual treat." Logan Kelly, in the same publication, called Ludo and Hoggle "not only incredible puppets, but incredible feats of engineering." Kevin Lally of the Courier News praised Labyrinth's puppet heroes as "technical marvels" with expressive faces and natural movements, but felt however that Ludo is one-dimensional as an "overgrown teddy bear." In The New Zealand Herald, Daniel Rutledge wrote that the film's puppets, particularly Ludo and Hoggle, are a big part of why Labyrinth "is so beloved", arguing that their being "physical beings moving about in a very tactile world makes them incomparably more real and lovable than CGI creations in a CGI world."

== Other appearances ==
Ludo appears in Labyrinth's tie-in adaptations, which include the novelisation by A. C. H. Smith and the three-issue comic book adaptation published by Marvel Comics, which was first released in a single volume as Marvel Super Special #40 in 1986. He also appears in the film's picture book adaptation and photo album.

=== Spin-off comics ===
Ludo features in the short comic Labyrinth: Rock Solid Friendship published by Archaia Entertainment as part of their 2014 Free Comic Book Day collection, as well as in multiple stories in the collections Labyrinth 30th Anniversary Special (2016) and Labyrinth: Shortcuts (2017).

Ludo has minor appearances in Return to Labyrinth, a four-volume original English-language manga sequel to the film created by Jake T. Forbes and published by Tokyopop between 2006 and 2010, and Labyrinth: Coronation, a 12-issue comic series written by Simon Spurrier and published by Archaia between 2018 and 2019.
