= Las Bóvedas =

Structure in Cartagena, Colombia

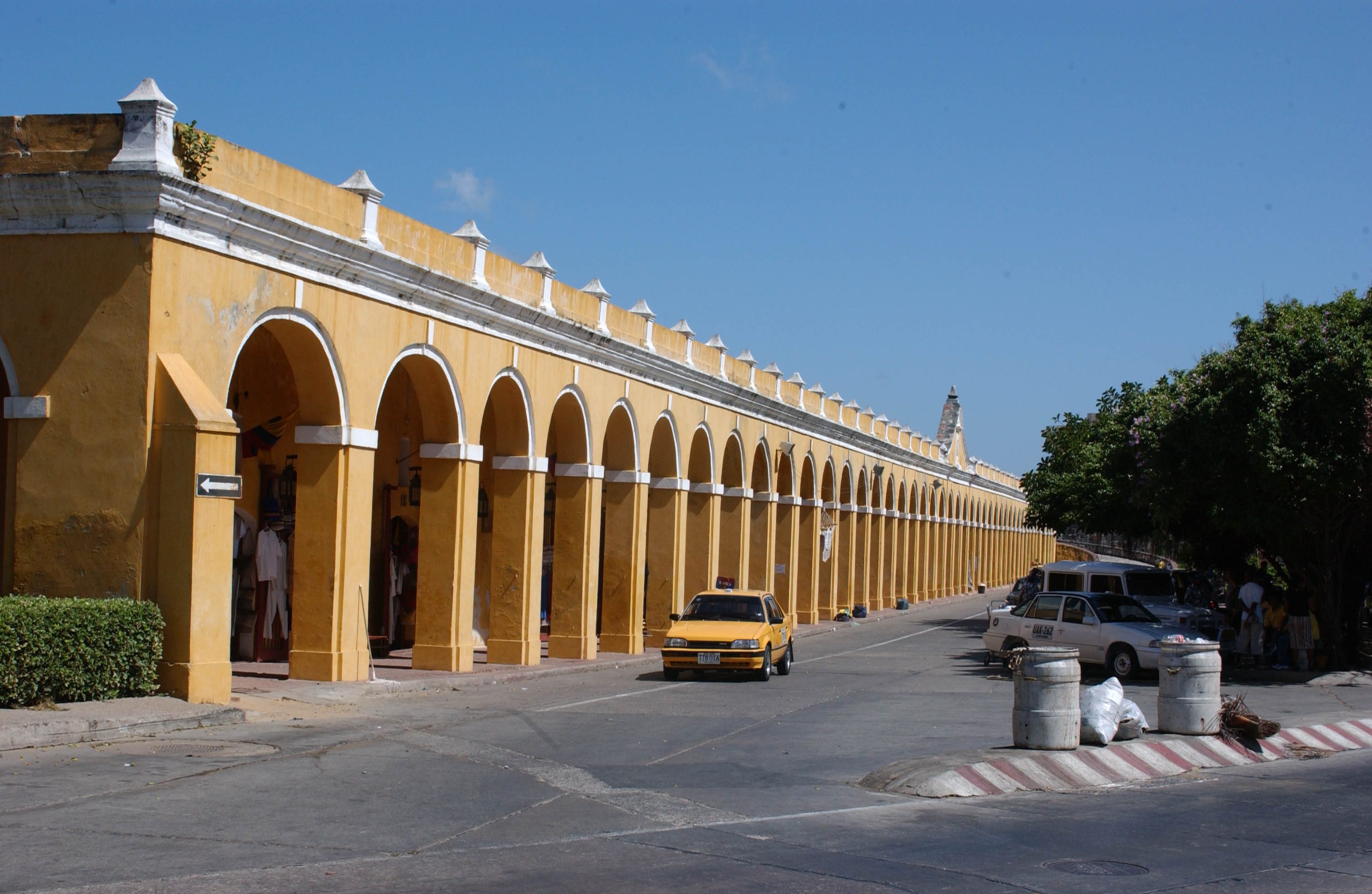
Las Bóvedas in 2005

Las Bóvedas (The Vaults) are a structure in the Old City of Cartagena in Colombia, attached to the walls. The Caribbean Sea is visible from the top of the structure. They were built as dungeons. They are located between the forts of Santa Clara and Santa Catalina.

== Structure ==
The cells in the dungeon now house shops, boutiques and other businesses along the stout walls protecting the old city of Cartagena, Colombia.

The arcades deep in the walls were designed as storage vaults but were used as prison cells during the civil wars in the 19th century; at high tide, the unfortunate internees were up to their knees in seawater.

The 23 bombproof vaults were built between 1789 and 1795, based on Antonio de Arebalo's design. The 47 porticos were completed in 1798. The vaults were used by the Spanish Crown as a garrison. Following independence, they were subsequently used for the same purpose by patriot and republican forces.

Today, Las Bóvedas is a popular tourist attraction because of its traditional Colombian merchandise and vast array of souvenirs.
