= Sarah Williams (Labyrinth) =

Fictional character

- Jennifer Connelly as Sarah in Labyrinth (1986).
- First appearance: Labyrinth (1986)
- Created by: Jim Henson; Dennis Lee
- Designed by: Brian Froud
- Portrayed by: Jennifer Connelly

In-universe information
- Relatives: Linda Williams (Note: In Sarah's room, a scrapbook of newspaper clippings about a stage actress named Linda Williams is marked in handwriting as "MOM" drawn with hearts. The Labyrinth novelisation confirms Linda as Sarah's mother.) (mother); Toby Williams (Note: In the Return to Labyrinth series, Williams is Sarah's father's family name. Irene is Toby's mother, making Sarah and Toby half-siblings.) (half-brother); Robert (Note: Sarah's father is unnamed in the film. He is named Robert in the Labyrinth novelisation.) Williams (father); Irene (Note: Sarah's stepmother is unnamed in the film. She is named Irene in the Return to Labyrinth series.) Williams (stepmother)
- Nationality: American

Sarah Williams is a fictional character and the protagonist of the 1986 musical fantasy film Labyrinth. Portrayed by Jennifer Connelly, Sarah is an imaginative teenager who wishes for the goblins from her favourite story to take away her baby brother Toby. When her inadvertent wish comes true, she must solve an enormous otherworldly labyrinth in thirteen hours and rescue Toby from the castle of Jareth, the Goblin King.

Created by director Jim Henson and writer Dennis Lee, the character was developed by a number of colleagues including screenwriters Laura Phillips and Elaine May as well as executive producer George Lucas. Sarah is Labyrinth's central character, in whose imagination the film's fantasy settings and characters exist, based on the books, posters and toys in her bedroom. Elements of her adventure were inspired by fairy tales and classical stories, as well as fantasy literature such as Alice in Wonderland and The Wizard of Oz.

Reception to the character upon the film's release was mixed, although Sarah has grown in the esteem of critics in recent decades. Reviewers were divided over her initial petulant attitude, with some regarding her as unsympathetic, while others have found her to be an identifiable teenage protagonist because of her flaws. The character's intelligence and perseverance have also received praise. Connelly's role as Sarah brought her international fame and has remained one of the actress's best known performances.

== Development ==
=== Concept and writing ===
Labyrinth started as a collaboration between director Jim Henson and conceptual designer Brian Froud following their previous collaboration, The Dark Crystal (1982). In making Labyrinth, Henson wanted to create a film that combined elements of fairy tales and classical stories in a script that would appeal to a modern audience. According to Froud, he and Henson decided to have human characters as the lead roles to make Labyrinth "more accessible and immediate" than The Dark Crystal, which had featured only puppets. Henson explained that they structured Labyrinth "in a way that the human is really carrying the whole picture" and acts as a "bridge" between the fantastical puppets and the audience. Froud had the initial idea of a journey through a labyrinth, and the protagonist was, at different stages of development, going to be a boy, a king whose baby had been put under an enchantment, a princess from a fantasy world, and a young girl from Victorian England. According to Henson, the decision to have the lead character be a girl was made "because so many adventure films feature boys. We just wanted to even the balance." To make the film more commercial, they made Sarah a teenager from contemporary 1980s America. Henson stated:

"We basically wanted to make Labyrinth about the growing-up process of maturity, working with the idea of a young girl right at that point between girl and woman, shedding her childhood thoughts for adult thoughts. Specifically, I wanted to make the idea of taking responsibility for one's life – which is one of the neat realizations a teenager experiences – a central thought of the film."

— Director Jim Henson to Starlog magazine.

According to co-writer Dennis Lee, he and Henson defined two main characteristics for Sarah as being "spunky, feisty, high-spirited" and "very volatile – poised on the brink of womanhood, and capable of trying out very different versions of whom she might be". Henson also wanted her to be initially spoiled and petulant to allow for her character to grow out of these flaws over the course of the film. Acknowledging that the character cannot experience every aspect of maturity in the course of an evening or an hour-and-a-half movie, Henson said that the film concentrates most of all on Sarah learning to take responsibility for her life as well as for her baby brother she is supervising. According to Henson's eldest daughter Lisa, Sarah's personality was partly modelled on Henson's second-eldest daughter, Cheryl, who had been "very romantic in her outlook" and passionate about fantasy and theatre as a teenager. Cheryl, who was a puppeteer on Labyrinth, admitted that she had inspired some aspects of the character, such as Sarah being "a little selfish, a little too smart for her own good", and her desire to escape to a strange world. Jim Henson was living with his three daughters while making Labyrinth, all of whom he had witnessed going through the same period of their lives as the teenaged Sarah, which according to Cheryl was significant to "the level of honesty" in the character's depiction.

Between the more than twenty-five iterations of the Labyrinth screenplay, the character was continually tweaked to create a lead role that audiences would find sympathetic and be able to relate to. Henson hired Fraggle Rock writer Laura Phillips to rewrite primary screenwriter Terry Jones' script, providing more insight into Sarah's inner life and personal interests. To further develop Sarah's character, Henson sought input from executive producer George Lucas, writer Elaine May and numerous colleagues. Lucas advised the structure of Sarah's journey based on his knowledge of mythological motifs and the work of Joseph Campbell. May's contributions "humaniz[ed] the characters", and made Sarah "a more authentic girl". Early production meetings also gave focus to reflecting Sarah's emotional journey through the film's visuals. Froud had suggested a labyrinth as a setting for the film, partly because he recognised it as symbolic of Sarah's mind due to its resemblance to a brain. According to Lee, the use of graphic artist M. C. Escher's work as basis for one of the set designs (the "Escher" staircase scene) served to create a scene where Sarah is forcibly detached from her previous taken-for-granted assumptions about the reliability of her own senses and her perception of time and space.

The dream world of the Labyrinth created for the film is centered around Sarah, with the influences of the film also being the influences of her mind. Henson stated, "the world that Sarah enters exists in her imagination. The film starts out in her bedroom and you see all the books she's read growing up – The Wizard of Oz, Alice in Wonderland, the works of Maurice Sendak. The world she enters shows elements of all these stories that fascinated her as a girl". Additional titles shown briefly in Sarah's room at the start of the film are Through the Looking-Glass, Grimm's Fairy Tales, a book of Hans Christian Andersen's fairy tales, and Walt Disney's Snow White Annual. The goblins that come to take her brother away, as well as Sarah's monologue that she recites to defeat the Goblin King, are from her favourite story, a play called "The Labyrinth" which she rehearses at the beginning of the film. Sarah's experiences in the Labyrinth are also reflective of the objects shown in her room. (Note: Jim Henson: "What [Sarah] goes through is based on her own sense of fantasy. In her room, you see nearly all the elements of the maze foretold, in her toys and books. And her dolls represent the creatures she will meet.") Many of the characters she encounters bear a resemblance to her toys, including a statuette of the Goblin King. The Labyrinth itself resembles her maze-puzzle board game. The dress Sarah wears in her ballroom dream adorns a miniature doll on her music box, which also plays the same tune as in her dream. One of the obstacles that Jareth sets on Sarah recalls the "Slashing Machine" record on her shelf, and Sarah's final confrontation with the king takes place in a room that resembles her poster of Escher's Relativity.

Some of Sarah's books and posters were those that had been childhood favourites of Henson's, as well as reflecting his children's interests. Henson said that by "plant[ing] all those things in Sarah's room as what she would dream about" they made the film "a homage to all the things we love."

=== Casting and filming ===
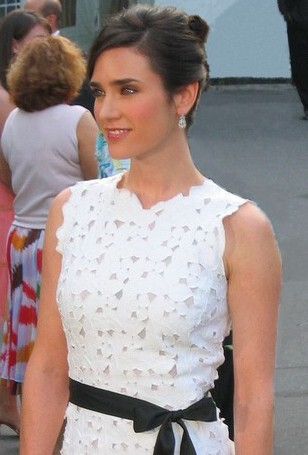
American actress Jennifer Connelly (pictured 2005) portrayed Sarah.

For the lead role of Sarah, a progressively maturing character, Henson sought "a girl who looked and could act that kind of dawn-twilight time between childhood and womanhood." 150 girls auditioned for the part in New York, Los Angeles, Chicago and London, with auditions starting in England in April 1984. A "dark and cynical" Helena Bonham Carter read for the role, but was passed over in favor of having Sarah be played by an American actress. Monthly auditions were held in the United States until January 1985. The list of American auditionees included Jane Krakowski, Mary Stuart Masterson, Yasmine Bleeth, Sarah Jessica Parker, Laura San Giacomo, Laura Dern, Ally Sheedy, Maddie Corman, Kerri Green, Lili Taylor, Mia Sara, Marisa Tomei, Molly Ringwald, Trini Alvarado, Tracey Gold, Claudia Wells, Jill Schoelen, and Danielle von Zerneck. Late in the casting process, Krakowski, Sheedy and Corman were considered to be the top candidates. Reading for the part in January 1985, Fourteen-year-old actress Jennifer Connelly "won Jim [Henson] over" and he cast her within a week. Recalling Connelly's audition, Henson said, "She did a terrific line-reading, then an improvisation that sent chills down my back ... she was simply a perfect actress." He felt that Connelly was "exactly right" for the role as she was "just at that point in her life that Sarah was in the picture." Connelly moved to England in February 1985 in advance of Labyrinth's rehearsals, and spent seven months between March and September 1985 making the film at Thorn-EMI Elstree Studios in London. She expressed that she had "always been the biggest fan of Sesame Street, so working with Mr. Henson was a dream."

Sarah was Connelly's fourth film role. Discussing her understanding of the part, Connelly said that Labyrinth is "about a sort of awakening ... a young girl growing out of her childhood, who is just now becoming aware of the responsibilities that come with growing up." She explained that Sarah learns "that she can't hold onto her childhood any longer. She has to change, and she must open up to other people and other things." Connelly also related the character's development to her own experience of adolescence, saying that while Sarah's change from child to adult is like an "on-off switch", for herself "It's more of a gradual progression. In some ways, I don't want to grow up, but I've always known it was going to happen. I haven't tried to stop it. In that way, Sarah and I are different."

Connelly enjoyed making Labyrinth, describing the experience as "joyous", "magical", and the film set as being "like a wonderland" for her, although there was "hard work, some real physical work" involved. Sarah is one of the few human characters in Labyrinth, and Connelly initially found it a challenge to interact naturally with the puppets she shared many of her scenes with. Comparing the experience to acting with animals, she found the creatures easy to relate to once she "stopped analyzing" and thought of them as characters instead of puppets. Connelly built a good rapport with Jim Henson, who she felt understood her very well due to him having a daughter the same age as her. She found Henson's direction both creative and receptive to her ideas, saying, "He has a very positive idea of how a scene should be, but if you do something different, he'll say, 'Well, that's not what I had in mind, but I like that, too. Let's go with it.'" Connelly also enjoyed working alongside her costar David Bowie (Jareth), from whom she learnt "to try many things ... to have fun with [acting], and to get to the point where you know your scene so well, that when you go to the set, you can just run with it, go in all different directions." Henson gave Bowie credit for his support of Connelly, stating, "He was of much assistance to her and helpful in a very human way." Connelly completed most of her scenes in two or three takes, except for very technical scenes or those involving complex puppets. Her most difficult stunt was the "Shaft of Hands" sequence where she descended a 30-foot-high shaft in a body mold attached to a hinged bar, accompanied by a camera mounted on a forty-foot vertical camera track. While Connelly named the ballroom scene as her favourite to film, she said she "had no skill whatsoever" at ballroom dancing, and had to have lessons with the scene's choreographer, Cheryl McFadden. She had a tutor on set so that she could keep up with her schooling while working on the film.

=== Costume ===
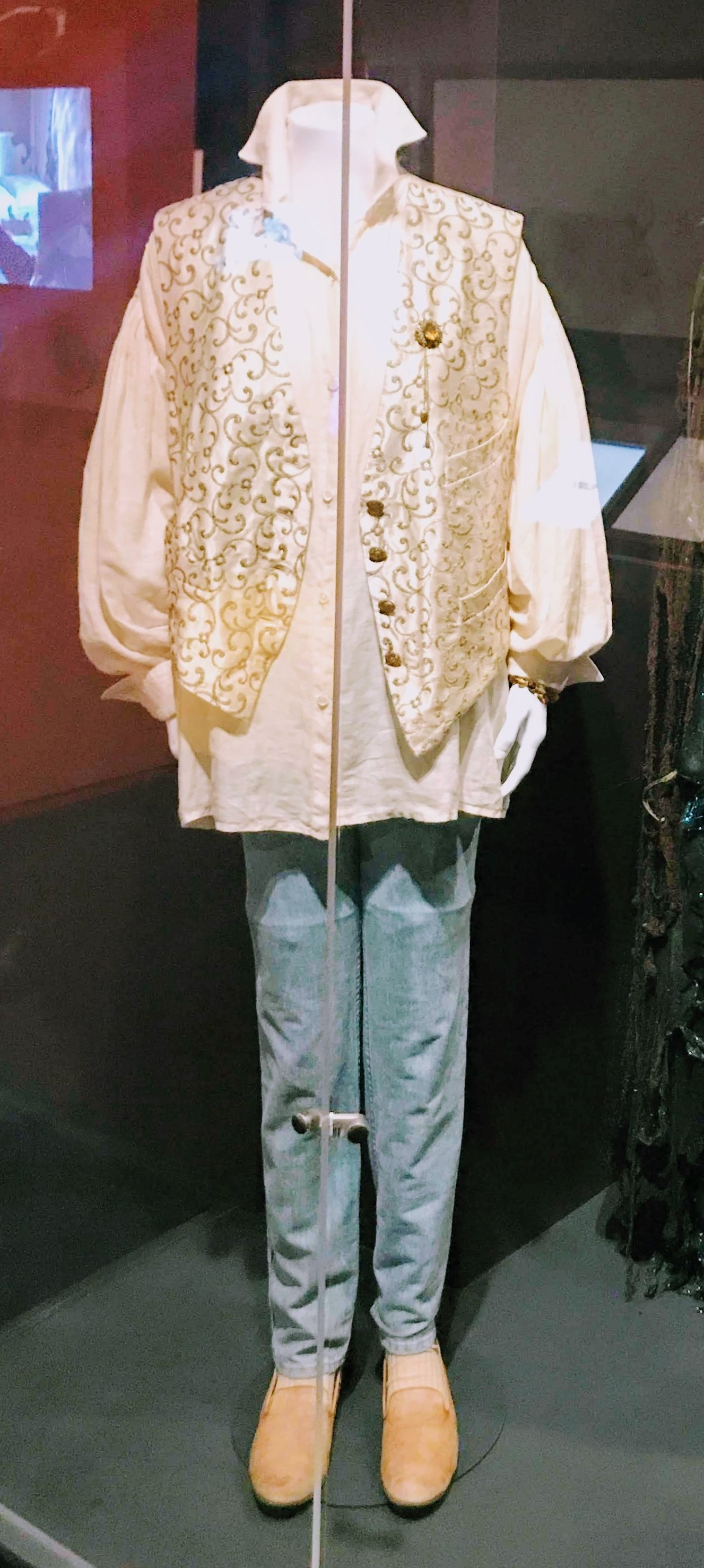
Sarah's main outfit of jeans, white blouse and waistcoat, displayed at the Museum of the Moving Image in New York City

The character's main outfit, consisting of a large white poet blouse, brocade waistcoat and jeans, was fashioned by Brian Froud and costume designer Ellis Flyte so that it "didn't place her precisely in this world" but would look appropriate in a fairy tale world. However, Sarah's blue jeans were meant to keep her contemporary. Sarah is first introduced in the film wearing a medieval-style gown which is revealed to be a costume when her jeans are shown beneath it.

In the scene of Sarah's masquerade ball fantasy, she wears a silver ballgown with puffed sleeves and gold detailing. The costumers wanted the character to look like "an otherworldly princess", and designed her outfit with a silver and mint colour scheme to set her apart from the other people in the scene. Sarah's ballgown was made from silver lamé and iridescent rainbow paper, overlaid with lace and jewels on the bodice, and worn with a pannier beneath the skirt. According to Flyte, it took much sampling and camera testing to achieve the "ethereal" effect of the gown's final design. According to Froud, Henson originally wanted Connelly's hair in ringlets for the scene, which "horrified" Froud and to which Connelly's parents disagreed, as they did not want her to appear too grown up. Working with the film's hairdressers, Froud eventually devised an "Art Nouveau" style for Connelly's hair with silver leaves and vines entwined at the sides, "something that was connected to nature and yet had a sophistication to it." Her hair was dressed with jeweled glue particles.

Sarah is depicted in her ballgown on the film's promotional poster, designed and painted by Ted CoConis. Henson had insisted that Sarah be portrayed in her blue jeans; however, CoConis overrode this input as he felt it "inappropriate for the look and feeling of the painting as well as the movie itself. [Sarah] simply had to be wearing the gorgeous gown".

== In Labyrinth ==
16-year-old Sarah Williams rehearses a play called The Labyrinth in the park with her dog Merlin but becomes distracted by a line she is unable to remember. Realizing she is late to babysit her baby half-brother Toby, she rushes home and is confronted by her stepmother before she and Sarah's father go out. Sarah then finds Toby in possession of her treasured childhood teddy bear, Lancelot. Frustrated by this and his constant crying, Sarah rashly wishes Toby be taken away by the goblins. She is shocked when Toby disappears and Jareth, the Goblin King, arrives. He offers Sarah her dreams within a crystal ball in exchange for the baby. Not having truly meant her wish, Sarah declines and insists on getting Toby back. Jareth then informs Sarah that Toby is in his castle at the centre of the Labyrinth, and that to retrieve the baby she must solve the maze in thirteen hours or Toby will remain in the goblin realm forever.

Sarah meets a cantankerous dwarf named Hoggle who shows her the entrance to the Labyrinth. She has trouble finding her way at first, but meets a talking worm who inadvertently sends her in the wrong direction. Entering a stone maze, Sarah uses her tube of lipstick to mark dead ends, only to find the stones she marked have been flipped. After encountering a double-doorway guarded by four guards and solving their logic puzzle, Sarah falls into a pit of talking hands and ends up in an oubliette, where she reunites with Hoggle. She bargains with him to lead her further into the Labyrinth in exchange for her bracelet. They pass through a tunnel of false alarms before being confronted by Jareth. Sarah boasts to Jareth that solving the Labyrinth is easy, and he sends a goblin-driven steel machine to chase her and Hoggle out of the tunnel. Hoggle reneges on his bargain with Sarah, and she steals his jewelry collection.

After encountering a strange old man with a talking bird for a hat, Sarah saves a gentle beast named Ludo from torture by some goblin soldiers. After passing a pair of talking door knockers and entering a forest, Sarah is ambushed by a group of wild creatures called the Fireys, who attempt to remove her head. Hoggle helps her to escape, and they both almost fall into the Bog of Eternal Stench but are saved by Ludo. They meet Sir Didymus, who guards the bridge over the Bog. The bridge collapses beneath Sarah but she is saved from falling into the bog when Ludo calls up rocks for her to walk on.

Hoggle, under Jareth's orders, gives Sarah an enchanted peach which makes her forget about her quest. Drawn towards some dream crystals sent by Jareth, Sarah is transported into a dream of a masquerade ball. She finds Jareth and they dance, until she rebuffs him and escapes the dream. Falling into a junkyard, she is distracted by an old Junk Lady who offers Sarah her various childhood items. Sarah's memory returns when she finds her book "The Labyrinth" and, realising that her belongings are all junk, she resumes her quest to save Toby, reuniting with her friends at the gate to the Goblin City.

After overcoming first the gate guard then the goblin army, Sarah arrives at Jareth's castle, whereupon she parts from her friends, insisting she must face Jareth alone and promising to call the others if needed. In a gravity-defying room of staircases, Sarah confronts Jareth while trying to retrieve Toby. As Jareth offers Sarah her dreams again, promising to be her slave on the condition that she fear, love and obey him, she remembers the line from her book: "You have no power over me!". She is returned home safely with Toby.

Realizing how important Toby is to her, Sarah gives him Lancelot. She sees Hoggle, Ludo and Didymus in her bedroom mirror and admits that even though she is growing up, she still needs them in her life every now and again. Her friends and a number of other characters from the Labyrinth appear in her room to celebrate with her.

== Characterisation and themes ==
=== Family and responsibility ===
Rita Kempley of The Washington Post identified Sarah as "the ingénue, a resourceful young woman with a wonderful imagination, great courage and a healthy case of sibling rivalry". At the start of the film, Sarah is a discontent 16-year-old who resents the babysitting responsibility that her father and stepmother expect her to take for her baby half-brother, Toby. Adam Trainer in Senses of Cinema wrote that the introduction of the stepmother indicates Sarah is a child of divorce, as were increasing numbers of children in the 1980s. Playbills and various news clippings in Sarah's room reveal that her absent mother Linda Williams is a stage actress in a romantic relationship with a male co-star, though it is unknown to what extent Linda is absent from Sarah's life. Connelly said that Sarah is at the start of the film "a bit closed off" due to her parents' separation and has "made her own little world where she's looking back and clinging on to memories, and doesn't really want to accept the fact that things change and [aren't] going to be the way she wants forever." Identified by academic T. S. Miller as "the stereotypical dreamer-girl", Sarah has a preoccupation with drama and romantic fairy tales, and is prone to playing pretend, using fantasy stories as a mental escape from her unhappy home life. Kelcie Mattson of Bitch Flicks wrote that while the character "boasts a full, varied emotional life" over the course of the film, initially she embodies several negative stereotypes of teenage girls, such as being immature, petulant, selfish and jealous. Describing Sarah as someone "resisting growing up, clinging to her childhood," Jim Henson said the character starts out as an "overspoiled brat" who neglects her brother and refuses to take responsibility for her life; this is encapsulated in the character's favourite expression, "It's not fair!". Mattson observed that Sarah's "defense mechanism against her growing responsibilities is to cast herself into a skewed fantasy" in which she is victimised by her parents. Rene Jordan of El Miami Herald identified the character as having "a Cinderella complex"; Sarah models her life on fairy tales and casts her well-meaning stepmother into the role of the wicked stepmother. Miller compared Sarah's over-use of fantasy in her life to that of Jane Austen's character Catherine Morland. Chris Cabin of Collider wrote that the rift between Sarah and her stepmother spurs the film's "anti-authoritarian mood".

Academic Andrea Wright observed similarities between Labyrinth and the literary and cinematic fantasies of Alice in Wonderland, The Wizard of Oz and The Company of Wolves, as narratives about girls in an unsettled domestic environment who "enter into a fantasy world where they are able to confront and explore the problems associated with their feelings towards their family and home." In i-D, Wendy Syfret contrasted Sarah to the "Mary Sue characters" prevalent in children's films, writing that she is "insecure, jealous and arguable [sic] vindictive", and fights to rescue her brother "not because she's experienced an awakening and is ultimately good, but because she has to". Sarah's animosity towards her brother turns into undying love when she is faced with the responsibility of rescuing him, wrote Today. Consequence wrote that Sarah redeems herself early on in the film when she turns down Jareth's offer of her dreams and resolves to save her brother. Her redemption arc further develops throughout the film; while in the Labyrinth, Sarah exhibits qualities such as compassion, quick-thinking and resoluteness, is "willing to trust others and open to evolution of thought," and overcomes her "pre-judgment, naivety, and her fear of the unknown". Author Brooke Covington wrote that Labyrinth is an allegory for accepting adulthood and the responsibilities that come with it. Sarah matures over her adventure, gradually freeing herself from childish impulses, becoming less selfish, and learning to take accountability for her actions. At the end of the film, Sarah assumes her role as an older sister by giving Toby the teddy bear that she refused him at first.

Highlighting the scene in which Sarah rejects her many childhood possessions as "junk" and refocuses on saving her brother, authors David R. Burns and Deborah Burns identified Labyrinth as an explicitly anti-consumerist text that encourages viewers to resist overconsumption and "embrace the fulfilment of human relationships" over material things. Wright, however, argued that the film's comment on consumerism is more complex, noting that the friends Sarah relies on to complete her quest are characters based on her toy collection, whom she later admits she needs "every now and again". Wright concluded that "Far from consigning the artefacts of childhood to the junkyard, the film endorses the importance of nostalgia." Jim Henson stated that Sarah's reunion with her friends serves to demonstrate that "You don't have to give up your fantasies because you grow up; they're part of you all your life."

"[Sarah]'s on that cusp between being an adult and a big sister ... and [the film is] her struggle to kind of compete with these two things. But of course, in the end, she enters adulthood on her own terms, not on the terms of society or what her peer group says she should be doing or what the temptations are; she moves into it as her own woman ... And love is, ultimately, the source of her strength."

— George Lucas, Labyrinth executive producer.

=== Coming of age and personal agency ===
The subtext of Labyrinth is understood by critics as Sarah's coming of age into womanhood, including her sexual awakening represented by the Goblin King. The A.V. Club's Tasha Robinson described the film as "a surprisingly frank exploration of the war between [Sarah]'s sexuality and her innocent childhood daydreams." Scholar Casey Reiland wrote that the character's naiveté is represented in her outfits of a white shirt and a white dress, a colour "symbolic of purity and innocence." The scene in which Sarah dreams of dancing with Jareth at a masquerade ball has been identified as a wish-fulfillment scenario of Sarah's "Cinderella fantasy". Several commentators have noted a parallel between Sarah's relationship to Jareth and that of Sarah's actress mother to her co-star love interest (also depicted as Bowie), author James Gracey observing, "Sarah finds that she too is tempted to make the same choice [as her mother] and abandon her family for a fantastical romance". Although Sarah initially desires freedom from her babysitting responsibilities, she comes to realise what Jareth offers her "isn't power and freedom, but isolation and selfishness," wrote Hodder & Stoughton editor Anne Perry. Sarah's encounters with the Goblin King show her that escaping permanently into a fantasy would mean ceding control over her own life, wrote Yahoo!'s Gwynne Watkins. Jonah Dietz of West Texas A&M University wrote that Sarah's action to summon the Goblin King, a character from her favourite story into which she inserts herself as his love interest, "basically makes [Labyrinth] a story about dangerous fan-fiction".

Sophie Mayer and Charlotte Richardson Andrews in The Guardian noted that despite the Hebrew meaning of Sarah's name being "princess", Sarah rejects her fantasy of being a princess when she bursts the bubble of her dream. Identifying Sarah's abandonment of her princess fantasies, and refusal to be treated as one, as the central theme of Labyrinth, Tor.com's Bridget McGovern wrote that the film "systematically reject[s] the usual 'princess" trope' through Sarah's refusal to find her "happy ending [...] on the arm of" King Jareth. Critics commonly contrast Sarah's decision and that of the young heroines in traditional fairy tales, such as "Cinderella", "Snow White" and "Sleeping Beauty", who ultimately marry a royal suitor. Like them, Sarah is offered marriage and a kingdom and the chance to "go right from parents to husband, escaping a wicked stepmother by running to the arms of a wealthy suitor," wrote L. S. Kilroy of online magazine Minerva; however, Sarah instead chooses "not to rush into adulthood before she's ready". Cat Lafuente of TheList.com wrote that although Jareth's offer would have made her a queen, Sarah rejects it "because she doesn't need his power, as she already has an immense amount of her own". Writing for Culteress, Kristen Lopez identified Sarah as a feminist character who "understands [Jareth's] manipulative and controlling ways" and "ultimately learns being under a man's thumb is no way to live", making Labyrinth a "refreshing ... story that tells girls they should be their own ruler."

Rookie and HelloGiggles noted Sarah as a rare example of a female lead in a fantasy adventure who is the rescuer rather than the rescued. Despite Sarah embodying many of the "trappings of the traditional damsel" such as a wicked stepmother, her agency "forges Labyrinth as a feminist antidote" to fairy tales with passive heroines saved by a man, wrote Sarah Maria Griffin for Scannain. Though as a girl who dreams of a fantasy world Sarah is often likened to Alice of Alice in Wonderland and The Wizard of Oz's Dorothy Gale, Watkins noted that Sarah differs from these characters as she does not "blithely stumble into her adventure." Labyrinth's story is driven by Sarah's decisions, with her wishing Toby away serving as the plot's primary catalyst. Noting that while Sarah's love for her brother catalyzes her adventure, and her friendships give her strength, Leah Schnelbach of Tor.com identified Sarah's self-esteem and resilience as the qualities that ultimately enable her to defeat Jareth. Ken Denmead of Wired observed similarities between Sarah and Princess Lili in the contemporary 1985 film Legend, as girls "coming of age by dealing with a mistake they'd made" and resisting a powerful, seductive male antagonist. Writing for The Black List Blog, Alissa Teige found that Sarah's dedication to rescuing her brother "defines her as a model for bravery, self-reliance and perseverance," and the character's logical problem-solving methods in completing the Labyrinth "shows girls that they can defeat any obstacle, if they put their minds to it". Sophie Mayer of The Guardian penned, "Equally adept at using her lipstick as a cunning tool or fighting off goblin soldiers, Sarah [is] adept and affective, neither hyper-feminine nor forced into a masculinised version of heroism." Jessica Ellis of HelloGiggles wrote that the character's stereotypically feminine traits, such as Sarah's ability to think creatively and to empathize, work to her advantage as she uses them repeatedly in her quest. Mary Rockcastle of Bust observed that "While Sarah is meant to look naïve, her decisions are quick and precise and she knows exactly how to use both her friends and her enemies to her advantage." Sarah actively resists temptation and distractions from her quest; when Sarah is subjected to Jareth's erratic whims and elaborate obstacles, Mattson wrote, "she actively resists his narrative, twisting the conflicts around to suit her needs until Jareth becomes the one reacting to her." Critics identify Sarah's realisation of her own agency as one of the film's most significant themes, culminated at the climax in her final remembrance and actualisation of the words, "You have no power over me".

=== Archetypal analysis ===
Sarah is identified as the Hero archetype in the Hero's journey monomyth. A. C. Wise cited Labyrinth as an example of Maureen Murdock's female-centric Heroine's journey model, "an inward-facing journey that teaches the heroine about herself, a focus on family, and the importance of friendship." Discerning Labyrinth as having Christian themes, Donna White in her contribution to the book The Antic Art: Enhancing Children's Literary Experiences Through Film and Video identified Sarah as a Christ figure because she is betrayed by Hoggle, "who is himself a Judas figure", and is continually tempted by a Satan-like Jareth. Sarah's final confrontation with Jareth takes place at the top of his castle, where he tempts her to give up her autonomy, similar to Satan's temptation of Christ on the mountain top. Brian Froud said that Sarah's eating of the peach is symbolic of "the apple that Eve is tempted with", and "about [Sarah] entering into [a sensual] phase of her life ... to grow up and to have knowledge of other things." AllMusic critic Steven McDonald discerned Labyrinth as a "variant on the Persephone story".

The film has also been interpreted by some critics as a modern variant of the fairy tale "Beauty and the Beast". Fairy Tale Review drew comparisons between Sarah and the heroine of Beauty and the Beast, observing that Sarah similarly is self-sacrificing for the sake of a family member, dances and argues with a "lonely and cruel" prince, and eventually breaks his heart. However, Sarah Monette of Uncanny Magazine refuted that Labyrinth is a retelling of "Beauty and the Beast" because Sarah does not reform Jareth, and wrote, "Just as Sarah refuses Jareth, Labyrinth refuses the incredibly dangerous myth that the 'love of a good woman' can change a brute (beast) into a prince".

== Reception ==
Initial reception to Sarah from critics upon the film's release was mixed, with a common criticism that the character came across as unsympathetic. The Post-Standard's Doug Brode wrote, "Sarah may be too convincing a representation of 1980s youth for the movie's good. She's too much like the protagonists of so many teen comedies about arrogant, self-serving kids whose parents are depicted as unfeeling monsters, even when they happen to be right." Rita Rose of The Indianapolis Star opined that because Sarah wishes away her brother, her attempt to get him back is "a heartless endeavor [that] makes it hard for us to care about her journey: Toby, after all, is better off with the jolly goblins than his nasty sister." However, the St. Louis Post-Dispatch's Joe Pollack defended Sarah as a "heroine who is allowed to redeem her terrible mistake". Allen Malmquist of Cinefantastique deemed Sarah "a passable hero" but found that "her riddle-solving ability comes out of nowhere, and her moments of cleverness ... come too seldom to really make you respect and root for her." Francie Noyes of The Arizona Republic felt that the film does not give enough focus to her character: "She is given little to do but push on bravely through [her] adventure. Jareth is more dynamic and the dwarf Hoggle is more endearing than Sarah is allowed to be."

While several reviewers considered Sarah to be overshadowed by the film's puppet characters and visual effects, David Sterritt of The Christian Science Monitor found the film engaging "largely because of its empathy with [Sarah] – who's always at the center of the tale, giving it a human focus that outweighs the show-offy gimmicks and crazy costumes." Describing the character as "an attractively self-possessed child-woman on a purposeful journey", Michael Walsh of The Province wrote, "Sarah is a contemporary teen with a timeless appeal." However, other critics were not as convinced by the character. Barry Norman, reviewing Labyrinth for Film '86, felt that Sarah is not entirely believable as "like most American teenagers, she seems too worldly and experienced to have much belief in fairies and goblins", a view also expressed by Ann Totterdell in The Financial Times. Paul Attanasio of The Washington Post felt that the film and character lacked a clear moral and that "all Sarah learns is some vague sense of her own independence". Describing Sarah as "a curiously eccentric and seriously snooty teenager", Joe Baltake of The Philadelphia Inquirer argued that the film's lessons about "maturity, responsibility and the real world" are undermined by the final scene in which Sarah is reunited with her friends from the Labyrinth, "illustrating that Sarah is addicted to her make-believe world more than ever".

Sarah has garnered a more positive reception in decades since Labyrinth's release. Heather Roche of the Times Colonist wrote that the character's "perseverance in solving the labyrinth is inspiring, and sends a great message to any viewers." Several commentators have considered Sarah to be an identifiable protagonist to teenagers because of her strong emotions and familial woes, as well as being relatable to children who spend a lot of time in their imaginations. Zaki Hasan of Fandor wrote favourably of Sarah as "an intelligent young woman, neither portrayed in stereotypical terms nor baselessly sexualized," who "never loses her agency, even as sinister forces conspire to keep her from her goal." Describing the character as a "hormonal hurricane ... bratty and forthright but impossibly likeable", Josh Winning of Total Film wrote, "In-between her numerous rants of "It's not fair!", Sarah's brash sensibilities mean she's at least clever enough not to act intimidated by the Goblin King even if her insides are shuddering ... Not only that, but she defeats her foe by using her brains, and doesn't rely on Prince Charming to come to her rescue." In a 2012 retrospective of Labyrinth, Vulture's Rebecca Milzoff found it "refreshing ... how Labyrinth offer[s] up a different kind of heroine than the Disney princess movies", as Sarah's goal is not to fall in love or find a husband. Contrasting Labyrinth to contemporary 1980s films about teenagers, Sarah Monette of Uncanny Magazine found Sarah's character offers teenage girls the "vanishingly rare" message that "it's okay not to want the sexualized, exaggeratedly feminine version of adulthood represented by [Sarah's] ridiculous white dress" and that having a boyfriend "is not a victory condition" nor essential to growing up.

Jennifer Connelly's performance as Sarah initially polarized critics and received strong criticism from some reviewers. Los Angeles Daily News critic Kirk Honeycutt referred to Connelly as "a bland and minimally talented young actress", while Gene Siskel of the Chicago Tribune dismissed her as "forgettable". Noting the importance of the role, Nina Darnton of The New York Times found Connelly's portrayal of Sarah "disappointing", saying, "She looks right, but she lacks conviction". Writing for The Miami News, Jon Marlowe opined that Connelly "is simply the wrong person" for the role and believed that her acting was too much "based on Ms. Goody Two Shoes". Some reviewers felt Connelly's performance lacked depth due to the script and direction of her character, describing Sarah's lines as "horribly hackneyed" and "sappy".

Contrary to these negative views, other critics praised her performance. Hailing Connelly as "the most engaging heroine" since Judy Garland in The Wizard of Oz and Elizabeth Taylor in National Velvet, Associated Press reporter Bob Thomas wrote that she "has such a winning personality that she makes you believe in her plight and in the creatures she encounters". Hal Lipper of the St. Petersburg Times similarly enthused that "Connelly makes the entire experience seem real. She acts so naturally around the puppets that you begin to believe in their life-like qualities." Frank Miele of the Daily Inter Lake wrote that Connelly managed to avoid emulating Garland's characterisation of Dorothy Gale to her own character's success, and "makes nary a false move" as Sarah. Lucy Choate Eckberg of Winona Daily News opined that Connelly "steals the show in her portrayal of Sarah".

Connelly's performance has garnered a more positive response in recent decades. Bridget McGovern of Tor.com wrote: "It's a tribute to Jennifer Connelly's performance that Sarah manages to exhibit all the hyper-dramatic martyrdom of your average 16-year-old while still seeming sympathetic and likeable – it's easy to identify with her". While finding Sarah to be "far from the most interesting protagonist", Brian Bitner of JoBlo.com praised Connelly's "incredible talent" for giving Sarah "humanity, grace, humor, and defiance." Michael Booth of The Denver Post wrote that "Connelly's glinting eyes and native intelligence carry the film". Glamour's Ella Alexander praised Connelly's portrayal of the protagonist as "empowering", while Liz Cookman of The Guardian wrote, "She is confident and good-looking, yet not as overtly sexual as women are so often portrayed on-screen – a much stronger female role model than many available today."

== Cultural impact and legacy ==
Despite underperforming at the U.S. box office upon initial release, Labyrinth was later a success on home video and television broadcasts, becoming a cult film. The film's lasting popularity and cult status have been attributed in large part to Sarah's character arc and Connelly's performance. Emma Islip of Comic Book Resources wrote in 2020, "To this day, viewers are invested in [Sarah's] trial and error coming of age story, personality, and place in the imaginative world. [Connelly's] acting abilities and charisma are what makes Labyrinth such a triumphant feat." The same publication further expounded the importance of Connelly's role in an article titled "Labyrinth Wouldn't Be a Classic Without Jennifer Connelly". Brian Froud attributes the film's longevity to generations of children responding to Sarah's "emotional journey". Uproxx's Alyssa Fikse reflected that many viewers see themselves in Sarah as she "reflect[s] that mix of fear and potential" in "standing on the brink of growing up [...] one of the scariest times in everyone's life". Ed Power of The Telegraph attributed Labyrinth's longevity to its being "a rare ... movie that takes seriously the experience of being a young woman finding her way in the world." IGN's Kayleigh Donaldson agreed with this assessment, and wrote, "The aesthetics of the film hypnotize but it's Sarah's victory over Jareth that we love so much."

Sarah's character resonates especially with the film's female audience. According to Eric Diaz of Nerdist, "Henson's attempt at a modern Alice in Wonderland story particularly resonated with thousands of young girls who saw themselves in [Sarah]", and the rarity of girls placed in the centre of heroic adventure fantasies is one reason why "so many girls of a certain age treat Labyrinth like it's their Star Wars." Demetria Slyt of the University of North Dakota wrote that Sarah's line, "You have no power over me", in particular "probably has had a huge impact on young women" learning to assert their individual agency as they mature. Recounting that Sarah's rejection of Jareth was the first instance she ever saw of a woman rejecting a man in a film, Mary Rockcastle of Bust wrote that the character's actions send a "vital message", stating that "Little girls especially need to see movies where girls don't succumb to unhealthy relationships but instead fight for their family over for love [sic]." In The Guardian, Charlotte Richard Andrews wrote that Sarah is "radical" as a teenage girl "not just slaying a lead fantasy role with her badassery, but battling a bona fide rock legend who takes her seriously, as both love interest and foe". Glamour's Ella Alexander stated similarly, "There is no other film where a teenage girl brings down a rock star villain".

Metro included Sarah on its list of "19 women every 90s schoolgirl wanted to be when she grew up", while Bustle featured Sarah in its article "7 Feminist Childhood Movie Characters That Made You The Woman You Are Today", writing that the character is a strong role model for girls because "once she realizes that the world isn't fair and she's in charge of her own destiny, she can do anything." Mom.com ranked Sarah on their list of the "50 Best Movie Heroines of All Time", citing her "cleverness, resourcefulness and bravery". SyFy Wire described Labyrinth as "one of the best depictions of female maturation and desire in pop culture of the '80s", while The Arizona Republic characterised it as one of "8 of the best movies that celebrate girl power" due to Sarah's "determination and moxie" in solving the Labyrinth.

Connelly's role as Sarah brought her international fame and made her a teen icon. Described by the International Business Times as the role that made Connelly "everyone's crush", the character has remained one of Connelly's best known performances. In 1997, Connelly said, "I still get recognized for Labyrinth by little girls in the weirdest places. I can't believe they still recognize me from that movie. It's on TV all the time and I guess I pretty much look the same." In 2008, Connelly said she found it amusing that many people continued to recognise her as Sarah two decades after she worked on the film.

Sarah's silver ballgown in the masquerade scene has been named as one of the "most iconic" dresses in movie history by Cosmopolitan, Wonderwall and Livingly, the latter calling it "as bold and theatrical as the movie itself." Stylist ranked Sarah's costume change from "baggy jeans and an embroidered waistcoat" into her "fantastical ballgown, with matching '80s hairstyle" among the "50 Best Movie Makeovers". The costumes Connelly wore as the character are displayed at the Museum of the Moving Image's exhibition The Jim Henson Exhibition: Imagination Unlimited, which premiered at the Museum of Pop Culture in Seattle before opening at its permanent home in New York City in 2017. UK bed retailer Dreams ranked Sarah's bedroom as the sixth "most iconic" bedroom from film and television, writing that it "perfectly exemplifies the 80's teenage girl room, with plenty of posters, floral bedroom furniture and stuffed toys that turn out to be the characters she meets on her quest".

== Other appearances ==
Sarah appears in Labyrinth's tie-in adaptations, which include the novelisation by A. C. H. Smith and the three-issue comic book adaptation published by Marvel Comics, which was first released in a single volume as Marvel Super Special #40 in 1986. She also appears in the film's picture book adaptation, photo album, and read-along story book.

=== Novelisation ===
Smith's novelisation of Labyrinth expands on Sarah's relationship with her absent mother, stage-actress Linda Williams, who had left Sarah and her father some years previously. While the subplot was left out of the film, various photos of Linda and her co-star love interest (actually Connelly's mother photographed with David Bowie) briefly appear in Sarah's bedroom along with newspaper clippings reporting their "on-off romance". Sarah idolises both her mother and the boyfriend, named Jeremy in the novelisation; the book elaborates on Sarah aspiring to follow their example to become an actress and fantasising about living their celebrity lifestyle. After her adventure in the Labyrinth, having matured and re-evaluated her life, Sarah puts all of the clippings of Linda and Jeremy away as well as the music box that her mother had given her. Brian Henson suggested that the Linda Williams subplot was created so as to avoid "making [Labyrinth] a 'dealing with death' movie", noting that if Sarah's mother had died the story would have had to address Sarah's loss as a significant "part of this journey that she's on".

=== "As the World Falls Down" music video ===
Sarah appears in the promotional music video for David Bowie's song "As the World Falls Down" from the Labyrinth soundtrack. Directed by Steve Barron in 1986, the video features French actress Charlotte Valandrey alongside footage of Jennifer Connelly taken from the film.

=== Spin-off comics ===
==== Return to Labyrinth ====
Sarah appears in Return to Labyrinth, a four-volume original English-language manga sequel to the film created by Jake T. Forbes and published by Tokyopop between 2006 and 2010. She is a supporting character in the series, which is set over a decade after the events of the film. After failing to get into the Juilliard School, Sarah has abandoned her ambitions to become an actress and lives a subdued life as an English teacher. She shares a close relationship with her brother Toby, who by this time is a teenager. Sarah is visited by Jareth, who has abdicated his throne and left the Labyrinth to Toby so that he could seek her out in the human world. Still in love with Sarah and desiring her as his queen, Jareth is disappointed to discover that she does not remember him and has discarded her fairy-tale fantasies for a more practical life. With the world of the Labyrinth in a deteriorating state and Jareth's powers weakening, he uses the last of his magic to jog Sarah's memories of him and the Labyrinth and attempts to entice her to create a new world with him from their shared dreams. However, Sarah wishes to preserve her friends from the Labyrinth, and realises her dreams by writing stories, allowing the existence of everyone in the Labyrinth to continue.

==== Archaia Entertainment comics ====
Sarah appears in Labyrinth: Coronation, a 12-issue comic series written by Simon Spurrier and published by Archaia Entertainment between 2018 and 2019. Her character and story arc is the same as that of the film, while the comic concurrently follows the parallel tale of Maria, another young woman who journeys through the Labyrinth to save a loved one, set several hundred years before Sarah. However, Maria ultimately fails to rescue her infant son, Jareth. The Labyrinth that Sarah traverses is very different to Maria's, as in the series the Labyrinth becomes shaped to reflect and challenge each individual who attempts to solve it.

Sarah has a minor appearance in Labyrinth: Masquerade, a one-shot story published by Archaia in 2020 about the ballgoers in her masquerade dream.

=== Merchandise ===
Sarah features in Labyrinth merchandise such as colouring and activity books, posters, and lobby cards.

A Funko Pop figurine of Sarah was released in 2016, which also came with a miniature figure of the Worm, a minor character from the film. Weta Workshop produced a vinyl figurine of Sarah as a part of its Mini Epics line in 2021. In 2023, pop culture product maker Plastic Meatball released a 3.75″ scale action figure of Sarah with the Worm and enchanted peach accessories.
