= Dungeon =

Room or cell for keeping prisoners

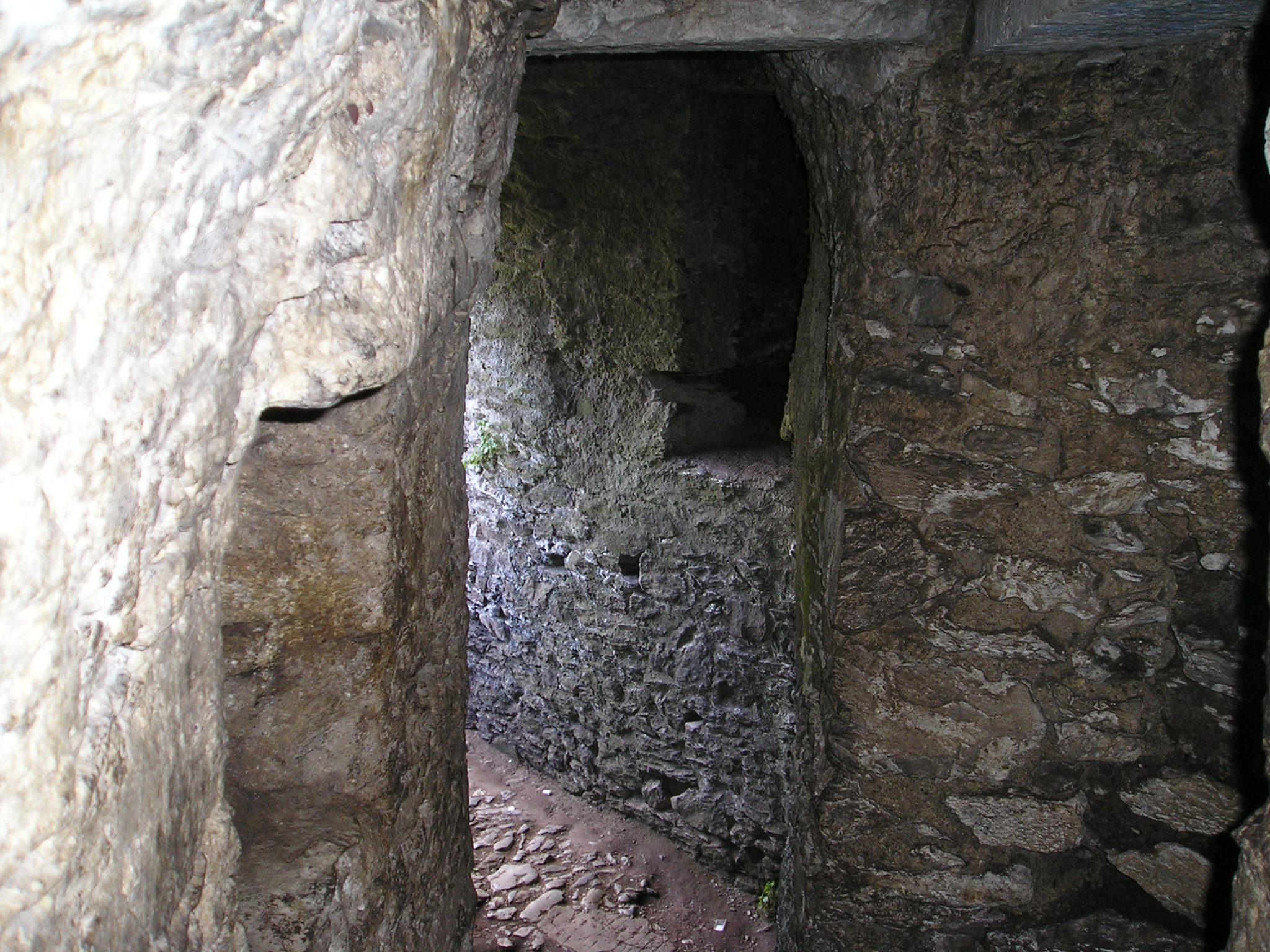
The dungeons of Blarney Castle, Ireland

A dungeon is a type of prison, usually an underground room or cell, in which prisoners are held. Dungeons are generally associated with medieval castles. They are closely connected in concept both to the prison and the oubliette (the latter a cell only accessible by a trapdoor in its ceiling), and the words are sometimes used interchangeably. In the popular imagination, a dungeon is claustrophobic, strong, damp, and located in a castle under the direct control of a medieval lord. This intentional unpleasantness and personal control over a dungeon contrasts to the modern prison, which provides a civil function.

== Etymology ==
The word dungeon derives from the Anglo-Norman donjun, meaning "keep of a castle" or "keep used as a prison". This in turn derives from the Old French donjon, meaning exclusively "keep", and possibly the Latin dominus, meaning "master" or "lord". The sense of "prison in a castle" is first attested in the 13th century Anglo-Norman.

The earlier meaning of "keep" is still in use for academics, although in popular culture, it has come to mean a cell or oubliette.

In French, the term donjon still refers to a keep. Donjon is therefore a false friend to dungeon (although the game Dungeons & Dragons is titled Donjons et Dragons in its French editions).

== Purpose ==
Dungeons often served only a temporary need. Not every castle contained one, and most never functioned as long-term prisons for civil use, but instead only until a personal dispute or ransom was settled. They were also often located close to the guardrooms or main gatehouse, often at ground level, in order to prevent the imprisoned from gaining access to the interior and allowing the guards to keep close watch. Many real dungeons are simply a single plain room with a heavy door or accessible only from a hatchway or trapdoor in the floor of the room above.

The use of dungeons for torture, along with their association to common human fears of being trapped underground, have made dungeons a powerful metaphor in a variety of contexts. Dungeons, as a whole, have become associated with underground complexes of cells and torture chambers. As a result, the number of true dungeons in castles is often exaggerated to interest tourists. Many chambers described as dungeons or oubliettes were in fact water-cisterns or even latrines.

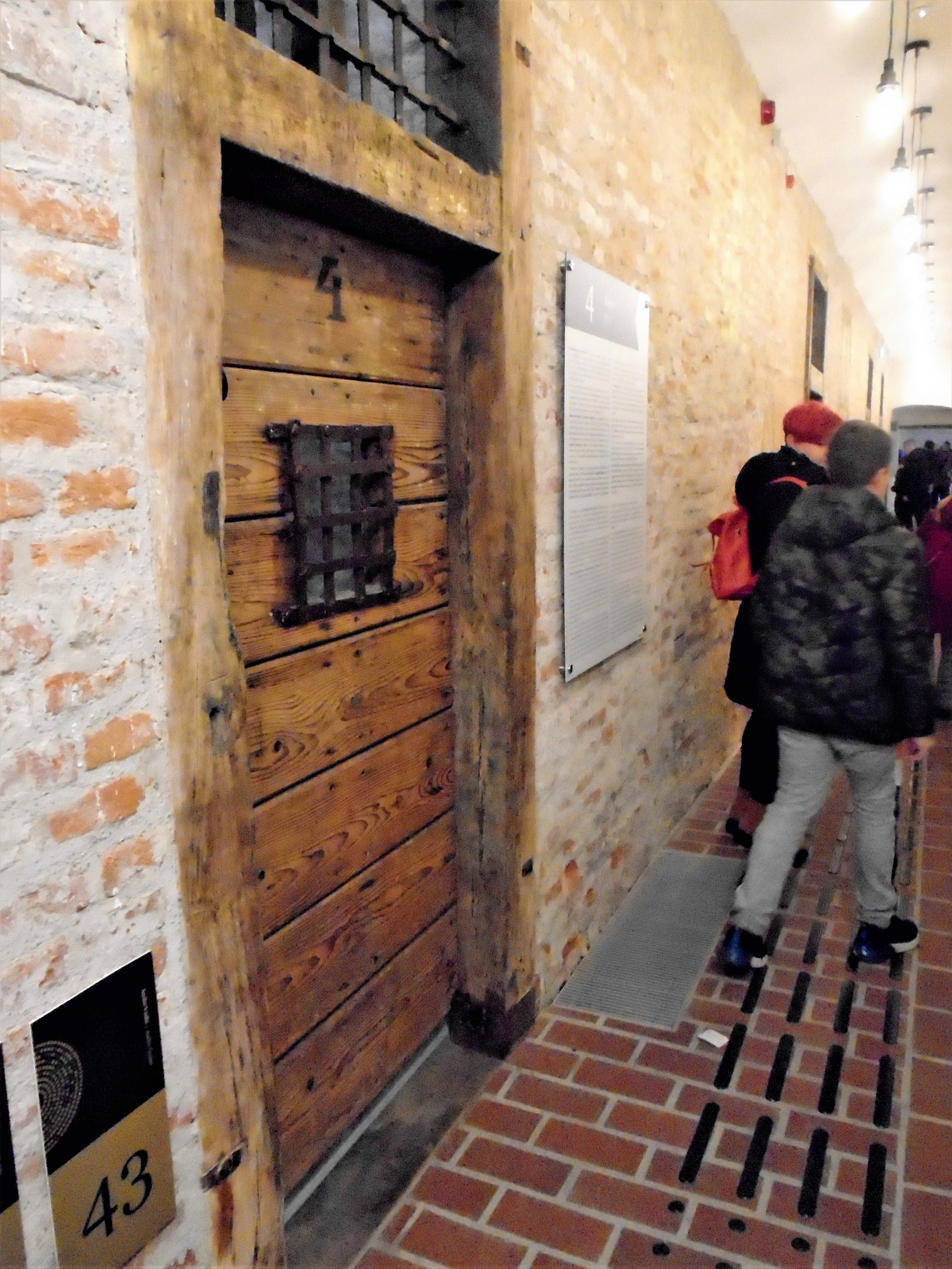
A dungeon door in the Zrinski Castle in Čakovec, Croatia

== History ==
Few Norman keeps in English castles originally contained prisons, which were more common in Scotland. Imprisonment was not a usual punishment in the Middle Ages, with most prisoners awaiting an imminent trial, sentence or a political solution. Noble prisoners were not generally held in dungeons, but lived in some comfort in castle apartments. The Tower of London is famous for housing political prisoners, and Pontefract Castle at various times held Thomas of Lancaster (1322), Richard II (1400), Earl Rivers (1483), Richard Scrope, Archbishop of York (1405), James I of Scotland (1405–1424) and Charles, Duke of Orléans (1417–1430). Purpose-built prison chambers in castles became more common after the 12th century, when they were built into gatehouses or mural towers. Some castles had larger provision for prisoners, such as the prison tower at Caernarfon Castle.

The identification of dungeons and rooms used to hold prisoners is not always a straightforward task. Alnwick Castle and Cockermouth Castle, both near England's border with Scotland, had chambers in their gatehouses which have often been interpreted as oubliettes. However, this has been challenged. These underground rooms (accessed by a door in the ceiling) were built without latrines, and since the gatehouses at Alnwick and Cockermouth provided accommodation it is unlikely that the rooms would have been used to hold prisoners. An alternative explanation was proposed, suggesting that these were strong-rooms where valuables were stored. Folklore often has it that one mode of use for oubliettes in the Borders, which would obviate latrines anyway, was to throw attackers into the oubliette, close the latch, and leave them to die. It seems likely that this gruesome act was threatened more often than it was carried out in practice, with the real aim being deterrence of potential attackers via the notoriety of the rumor that such a fate was entirely possible, and (plausibly) perhaps not unlikely, for anyone who might dare to attack.

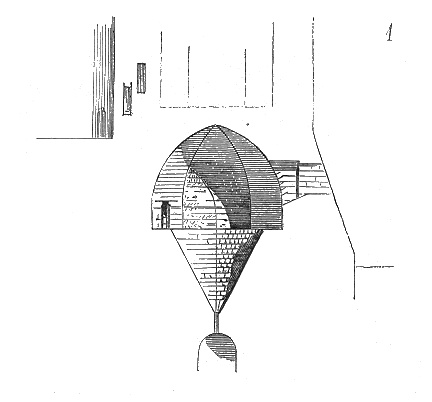
Diagram of an alleged oubliette found in the Bastille prison in Paris, from Viollet-le-Duc (1854–1868). the commentary [by le Duc?] speculates that the structure depicted, may actually have been an ice well built to keep ice.

An oubliette (from French oublier "to forget") is a basement room which is accessible only from a hatch or hole in its high ceiling. "Bottle dungeon" is sometimes simply another term for an oubliette. It has a narrow entrance at the top and sometimes the room below is even so narrow that it would be impossible to lie down but in other designs the actual cell is larger.

The earliest use of oubliette in French dates back to 1374, but its earliest adoption in English is Walter Scott's Ivanhoe in 1819: "The place was utterly dark—the oubliette, as I suppose, of their accursed convent."

An example of what might be popularly termed an oubliette is the particularly claustrophobic cell in the dungeon of Warwick Castle's Caesar's Tower, in central England. The access hatch consists of an iron grille. Even turning around (or moving at all) would be nearly impossible in this tiny chamber. However, the tiny chamber that is described as the oubliette, is in reality a short shaft which opens up into a larger chamber with a latrine shaft entering it from above. This suggests that the chamber is in fact a partially back-filled drain. The positioning of the supposed oubliette within the larger dungeon, situated in a small alcove, is typical of garderobe arrangement within medieval buildings. These factors perhaps point to this feature being the remnants of a latrine rather than a cell for holding prisoners.

== In fiction ==
Oubliettes and dungeons were a favorite topic of nineteenth century gothic novels or historical novels, where they appeared as symbols of hidden cruelty and tyrannical power. Usually found under medieval castles or abbeys, they are often used in the narrative by villains persecuting blameless characters. For example, in Alexandre Dumas's La Reine Margot, Catherine de Medici is portrayed gloating over a victim in the oubliettes of the Louvre.

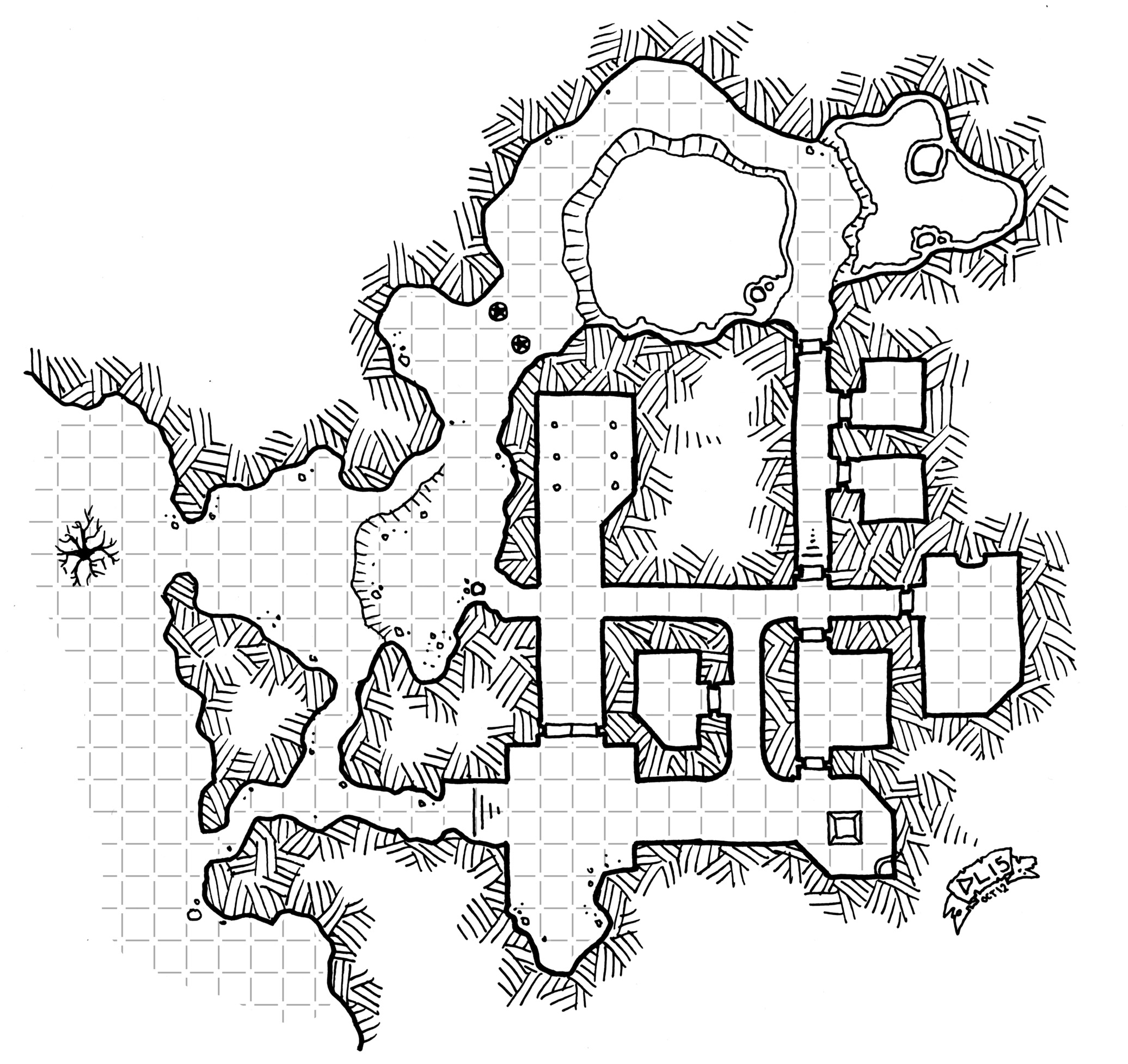
A "dungeon" map created for a tabletop roleplaying game

Dungeons are common elements in modern fantasy literature, related tabletop, and video games. The most famous examples are the various Dungeons & Dragons media. In this context, the word "dungeon" has come to be used broadly to describe any labyrinthine complex (castle, cave system, etc.) rather than a prison cell or torture chamber specifically. A role-playing game largely consisting of dungeon exploration is called a dungeon crawl.

Near the beginning of Jack Vance's high-fantasy Lyonesse Trilogy (1983–1989), King Casmir of Lyonesse commits Prince Aillas of Troicinet, who he believes to be a vagabond, to an oubliette for the crime of having seduced his daughter. After some months, the resourceful prince fashions a ladder from the bones of earlier prisoners and the rope by which he had been lowered, and escapes.

In the musical fantasy film Labyrinth, director Jim Henson includes a scene in which the heroine Sarah is freed from an oubliette by the dwarf Hoggle, who defines it for her as "a place you put people ... to forget about 'em!"

In the Thomas Harris novel The Silence of the Lambs, Clarice makes a descent into Gumb's basement dungeon labyrinth in the narrative's climactic scene, where the killer is described as having an oubliette.

In the Robert A. Heinlein novel Stranger in a Strange Land, the term "oubliette" is used to refer to a trash disposal, much like the "memory holes" in Nineteen Eighty-Four.

The famous short story by Edgar Allan Poe The Pit and the Pendulum describes a condemned to death held captive in a dungeon during the Spanish Inquisition.

== See also ==
- Immurement
- Keep
