= Hoggle =

- Hoggle in Labyrinth.
- First appearance: Labyrinth (1986)
- Created by: Jim Henson; Dennis Lee
- Designed by: Brian Froud
- Portrayed by: Shari Weiser; Brian Henson
- Voiced by: Brian Henson

In-universe information
- Species: Dwarf
- Gender: Male
- Occupation: Groundskeeper, gatekeeper
- Affiliation: King Jareth
- Nationality: Goblin Kingdom

Hoggle is a fictional character in the 1986 fantasy film Labyrinth. Voiced by Brian Henson, Hoggle was performed as a radio-controlled animatronic puppet with body movements by Shari Weiser. The character was created by director Jim Henson and writer Dennis Lee, and designed by Brian Froud.

A cowardly and irascible dwarf, Hoggle is a servant of King Jareth who is befriended by Sarah Williams. Though tasked with hindering Sarah's progress on her quest through the Labyrinth, Hoggle develops loyalty to her, ultimately helping her to reach Jareth's castle and retrieve her baby brother whom she wished away to the goblins.

The character received a generally positive reception from film critics.

== Development ==
Labyrinth started as a collaboration between director Jim Henson and conceptual designer Brian Froud following their previous collaboration, The Dark Crystal. In making Labyrinth, Henson wanted to create a film that combined elements of fairy tales and classical stories in a script that would appeal to a modern audience. Unlike The Dark Crystal, which had featured only puppets, Henson and Froud wanted Labyrinth to include interactions between puppet creatures and human characters, "almost like a throwback to the original Muppet Show", with a greater focus on characters' personalities and relationships. Froud had the initial idea of a journey through a labyrinth, and in the film's early discussions the main characters included a king and his jester, Snotweed. Writer Dennis Lee's first treatment of the story changed the protagonist to a young teenaged girl and Snotweed became her companion "Hoggle, the warty dwarf", who, as Sarah's guide through the Labyrinth, is one of the film's most important characters thematically. Froud stated that he designed Hoggle to appear "storybook", in such a way that "he's part goblin, and maybe a dwarf from "Snow White and the Seven Dwarves"." The swirls in his costume are a slight reference to the Mystics in The Dark Crystal. Froud also designed a face hidden on Hoggle's back, inspired by "medieval manuscripts and gothic architecture in which there are always faces peering out at you."

As with all of the non-human characters in Labyrinth, Hoggle was performed through puppetry and animatronics produced by Jim Henson's Creature Shop. Hoggle required five performers to work in sync: Shari Weiser inside the costume performing the body movement and four puppeteers controlling the animatronic face via radio controls, coordinated by Brian Henson, who controlled Hoggle's jaw movements and provided the character's voice. Mak Wilson, David Greenaway and Robert Tygner each controlled specific parts of Hoggle's nose, eyebrows, eyes and lips. According to biographer Christopher Finch, Hoggle was an evolution of the "humans with Muppet heads" concept that had begun with Henson's 1969 television special, Hey, Cinderella!, but "went way beyond anything imagined at [that] time". The first fully wireless character that the Jim Henson Company made, the Hoggle puppet was the also the most technically complex puppet used in film at the time, involving 18 motors to control all the different portions of the face. Jim Henson stated that he had originally thought to create another more elaborate head for close-up shots that would be cable-controlled, as most animatronics had been in the past, but found they were able to achieve Hoggle's full face movements with radio control. This "gave us a lot more freedom with the character, because now he can walk about the set while we're shooting," Henson said. A television monitor was incorporated into the inside of the puppet's head that showed Weiser what the camera saw, but trying to perform with this did not work for her; instead the interior mouth pieces were removed so that Weiser, wearing black makeup, could see out through Hoggle's mouth when it opened. As they wanted Hoggle to have "large, masculine, clunky hands", Weiser operated oversized mechanical fingers worn over her own; however, this made it impossible for her to grip anything, so a hand in a fixed position was used whenever Hoggle needed to be holding an object.

The complexity of performing the puppet meant that weeks of rehearsals were needed for Hoggle's scenes. Acting alongside Hoggle was also initially a challenge for David Bowie and Jennifer Connelly, who portrayed Jareth and Sarah respectively. In his first few scenes with the puppet, Bowie was disorientated as "he kept wanting to look off-stage to where [Hoggle's] voice was coming from ... instead of where Hoggle, the puppet, actually was," Jim Henson recalled, "It took him a while to get used to that aspect". Similarly, Connelly stated during filming, "When we first started I'd be looking in Hoggle's mouth to talk to Shari. Now I just talk to Hoggle."

Brian Henson voiced the character after the initial plan to sync up a voice actor with the puppeteers proved to be too difficult. Although Hoggle had been planned to have a British accent, Brian created a "somewhat-kinda cockney New York type voice" for the character "that eventually grew on everybody"; Jim Henson attempted to record a new voice for Hoggle in post production, but ultimately decided to keep Brian's. As Weiser could only see out of the costume when the puppet's mouth was open, Brian developed Hoggle's speech to include frequent "grunting and moaning and yowling" so as to have him open his mouth often; for the same reason, the character is "always grumbling and mumbling to himself" when walking. In the final soundtrack, Brian's voice was run through a harmonizer and lowered in pitch to better fit the character.

Sometime after Labyrinth was completed, the Hoggle puppet was lost in a suitcase during transit, eventually resurfacing in 1997 at the Unclaimed Baggage Center in Scottsboro, Alabama. The puppet has been restored twice, most recently in 2022, and is on display at the Unclaimed Baggage Museum in Scottsboro.

== In Labyrinth ==
Hoggle is approached by Sarah as she begins her quest to reach King Jareth's castle at the centre of the Labyrinth and rescue her baby brother. Hoggle shows Sarah the Labyrinth's entrance but warns her that attempting to solve it is futile and that she takes too much for granted.

When Sarah's progress stalls, Hoggle offers to escort her back to the start, but she bribes him with a plastic bracelet to guide her forward instead. Confronted by Jareth, Hoggle falsely claims he is returning Sarah to the beginning; Jareth sees through the lie and threatens to suspend him over the Bog of Eternal Stench if he continues helping her. Admitting he is afraid of Jareth, Hoggle attempts to abandon Sarah, but she stops him by seizing his jewellery collection. Sarah calls Hoggle her friend despite his duplicity, a role he briefly accepts before fleeing at the roar of an unseen beast.

On his way back to assist her, Hoggle is again intercepted by Jareth, who commands him to give Sarah an enchanted peach and warns that if she kisses him, Jareth will turn him into the “Prince of the Land of Stench”. After Hoggle rescues Sarah from the Fireys she kisses him in thanks, sending them both to the Bog; they are saved by Ludo, the beast Sarah earlier freed, and joined by Sir Didymus. Hoggle attempts to dispose of the peach but is stopped by Jareth. Reluctantly, he gives Sarah the peach, which puts her under an amnesiac enchantment, and flees in shame.

As Hoggle laments losing his only friend, Sarah breaks the spell and reunites with Ludo and Sir Didymus. The trio is halted by Humungous, a giant mechanical guardian of the Goblin City, but Hoggle subdues it by dislodging its pilot and halting its advance before it explodes. Forgiving him for the peach, Sarah returns his jewellery, and Hoggle helps her reach the castle to confront Jareth.

After Sarah returns home with her brother, Hoggle, Ludo and Sir Didymus appear in her mirror to assure her that they will be there for Sarah should she need them; she admits that she does and they appear in her bedroom for a raucous celebration.

== Characterisation and themes ==
BBC Culture's Luke Buckmaster described Hoggle as "a morally dubious, Sméagol-esque character whose motives and allegiances are unclear." A double agent, Hoggle is torn between helping Sarah and obeying Jareth's orders to hinder her progress. "His moral ambiguity and clash of alliances make him a complicated character who drives a central point of the narrative," wrote Courtney Mason of Screen Rant. Fairy Tale Review identified Hoggle as Sarah's "white rabbit", as he guides her through the maze but betrays her trust. The Artifice highlighted the face on the back of Hoggle's vest as indicating the character's "two-faced" (deceitful) nature, and noted that it also "invokes the two-faced Roman god of thresholds, Janus"; Hoggle is the gatekeeper who shows Sarah the entrance to the Labyrinth. Several commentators have identified Hoggle as a Judas figure due to his betrayal of Sarah.

"Cantankerous, selfish, sly, deceitful, childish, and cowardly", Hoggle also shows himself to be "clever, brave, loyal, decent," with a heart of gold, state the film's production notes. Catharine Rambeau of the Detroit Free Press identified him as "a cross between L. Frank Baum's Tin Man and Cowardly Lion". Morally conflicted, he is a reluctant hero. Brian Henson described Hoggle as "a grumpy old man who regrets everything [he's] ever done in his life" and who tries "as hard as he possibly can to make it appear that he has no heart whatsoever", when in fact he is very sensitive; Hoggle protects his heart because "feeling is so painful and overwhelming for him". Discussing the relationship between Hoggle and Sarah, A. C. H. Smith, the author of the Labyrinth novelisation, said that Hoggle has been a "rather lonely, disadvantaged, self-pitying little creep" but because Sarah is kind to him and takes him seriously he "becomes a proper person in his own eyes". Serena Toh in The Straits Times noted the film's major theme of friendship shown in Hoggle's transformation from a selfish creature to a loyal friend. Noting that Sarah and Hoggle's relationship is forged "through a complicated process of distrust, bonding, betrayal, guilt, and redemption", Bridget McGovern of Tor.com wrote that Labyrinth shows the complexity of friendship and trust as a learning process that includes both risk and reward. Sarah and Hoggle together learn the value of forgiveness; The Mary Sue's Sara Godwin identified one of the film's important lessons as giving people a second chance, writing "Sarah was justifiably upset when he betrayed her, but Hoggle came through. He grew as a character, overcame his fear, and stood strong when it really counted."

Hoggle is a materialistic character, with a love of jewellery. Noting a twist on the German fairy tale "The Frog Prince" in Jareth's threat to Hoggle that he will turn him into a "Prince of the Land of Stench" if Sarah kisses him, scholar Tammy H. Gladwin wrote that Labyrinth challenges the "Prince Charming ideal" by reversing princehood from a desirable fate into one to be loathed; Hoggle learns that he does not need to be brave or handsome to be worthy of Sarah's friendship. Despite Sarah's and the audience's first impression of Hoggle's "crude masculinity" when he is introduced urinating into a pond, Gladwin wrote that Hoggle's obsession with pretty jewels subverts norms of stereotypical masculine behaviour.

== Reception ==
Ahead of Labyrinth's release in the U.S. in June 1986, Hoggle was brought to a New York press conference to promote the film. According to Jim Henson, reporters engaged directly with the puppet: "They weren't looking at my son Brian, who was standing to one side doing Hoggle's voice, or the four puppeteers controlling his facial expressions electronically," Henson said, "They were actually trying to talk to Hoggle. It was fascinating."

Hoggle received mostly positive feedback from entertainment critics. Several reviewers referred to the character as "endearing" and "lovable". Carole Kass of the Richmond Times-Dispatch wrote, "We can't help but fall for the fey and ugly Hoggle", while Alaina Urquhart-White of Bustle described him as "that character that you don't want to love because he's a grump, but you end up rooting for anyway." Pointing to Hoggle as an example of Labyrinth's creatures being grotesque without being unappealing, Tyler Dean of Reactor described him as "an ugly little troll who somehow still has all the rugged swagger and cantankerous personality of a late-in-life Harrison Ford." According to Screen Rant, "Hoggle's uniquely lovable personality has made him a favorite" among viewers. The same website ranked Hoggle among the "10 Most Underrated Jim Henson Creations", arguing that he deserves more recognition as he shows "the potential of every villain who decides to do the right thing."

Some contemporary reviewers took a more mixed or negative view of the character. The Post-Standard's Doug Brode argued that Hoggle is nothing more a recycled Grumpy from Disney's Snow White, while Allen Malmquist of Cinefantastique found that he "capsulates a mundane reluctant-helper personality" and opined that Ludo and Sir Didymus were more interesting characters, Kevin Lally of the Courier News praised Hoggle as a "technical marvel" noting his "expressive face" and "natural movements", but felt that the character is "too cranky" to be likeable. Paul Willistein of The Morning Call complained that much of the film's humour was "gross", citing the scene where Hoggle zaps fairies with a bug sprayer.

Hoggle's design and puppetry has received praise even decades after the film's release. Luke Buckmaster of BBC Culture enthused, "With a huge lumpy nose, spurts of shoulder-length white hair and a crinkled, finely detailed face, Hoggle is an amazing puppet, at once both magical and realistic". Chris Cabin of Collider wrote that his face exhibits "an indisputable warmth that comes from studied, unique, and intimate design and physical work", and in the same publication, Logan Kelly called the puppet an "incredible feat of engineering" resulting in "a lifelike character that CGI has rarely been able to match". Lauding the performances in Labyrinth's finale scene, Karl Puschmann of The New Zealand Herald remarked, "Hoggle’s sad sack demeanour lifts and he seems to grin — an incredible piece of acting from a person in a puppet suit". Also in The New Zealand Herald, Daniel Rutledge wrote that the film's puppet characters, particularly Hoggle and Ludo, are a big part of why Labyrinth "is so beloved", arguing that their being "physical beings moving about in a very tactile world makes them incomparably more real and lovable than CGI creations in a CGI world." Rating Hoggle among the "Top 14 Best Jim Henson Creatures of All Time", SciFiNow gave the character a "nightmare factor" of 3/5, writing, "His eerily realistic facial expressions are definitely in uncanny valley territory."

== Other appearances ==
Hoggle appears in Labyrinth's tie-in adaptations, which include the novelisation by A. C. H. Smith and the three-issue comic book adaptation published by Marvel Comics, which was first released in a single volume as Marvel Super Special #40 in 1986. He also appears in the film's picture book adaptation and photo album.

=== Music videos ===
Hoggle appears in two music videos for the David Bowie songs "Underground" and "As the World Falls Down" from the Labyrinth soundtrack. Produced by Steve Barron in 1986, both videos were released on the 1993 VHS tape Bowie - The Video Collection and the 2002 two-disc DVD set Best of Bowie. The videos feature footage of Bowie (as himself) performing the songs accompanied by Hoggle.

=== Spin-off comics ===
==== Return to Labyrinth ====
Hoggle appears in Return to Labyrinth, a four-volume original English-language manga sequel to the film created by Jake T. Forbes and published by Tokyopop between 2006 and 2010. In the manga, Jareth has delivered on his threat to turn Hoggle into the Prince of the Land of Stench. Hoggle lives in a small cottage in the Bog, has a small throne and several goblin underlings.

==== Archaia Entertainment comics ====
Archaia released a short story titled Hoggle and the Worm for Free Comic Book Day on May 5, 2012. Hoggle also features in the 2018 short story En Guard, which provides a backstory for how he became the caretaker of the Labyrinth. He has a minor appearance in Labyrinth: Coronation, a 12-issue comic series written by Simon Spurrier and published by Archaia between 2018 and 2019.
