= Unclaimed Baggage Center =

Retail store selling items from lost airline luggage in Scottsboro, Alabama, U.S.

Coordinates: 34°40′25″N 86°2′39″W

Unclaimed Baggage
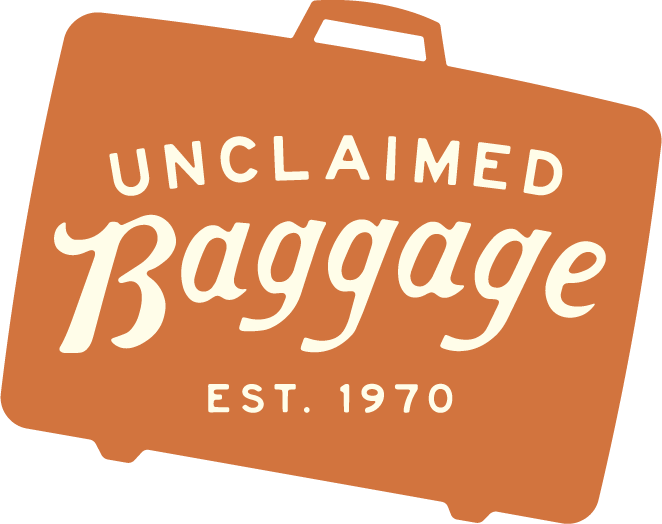
- Founded: 1970; 56 years ago in Scottsboro, Alabama, US
- Founder: Doyle Owens
- Website: www.unclaimedbaggage.com

Unclaimed Baggage is a retail store located in Scottsboro, Alabama that sells items from lost or unclaimed airline luggage. Founded in 1970, it is the only store of its kind in the United States. It has received national attention, including mentions on The Oprah Winfrey Show, Late Night with David Letterman, Fox News and the Today show. Over a million customers visit the 50,000-square-foot (4,600 m^{2}) store each year to browse through some of the 7,000 items added each day. Most items are sold for a discount of 20–80%.

== History ==
In 1970, Scottsboro, Alabama insurance salesman Doyle Owens heard from a bus driver friend on ham radio that the Trailways buses had too much unclaimed luggage to deal with. Owens became inspired to buy and sell the luggage, so he drove a borrowed pickup truck and got the bags from Washington D.C. He did not sell airline luggage until 1978, when he formed his first airline deal with Eastern Airlines. He then began partnerships with the rest of the United States domestic airlines.

In 1995, Doyle sold the store to son Bryan Owens and wife Sharon, who expanded the storefront to its current size, the length of a city block, and introduced a museum and cafe. Oprah featured Unclaimed Baggage in 1995, bringing it national attention.

Doyle Owens died on December 3, 2016, at the age of 85.

In 2024, Leanne Morgan visited Unclaimed Baggage and shared her experience on TikTok.

== Operations ==
Less than one half of one percent of luggage is unclaimed in the United States, and more than half of it is donated or thrown away by Unclaimed Baggage because it is unsuitable for sale. The surviving items are organized within the store by category.

Although most goods are not reunited with their owners, the company has made occasional exceptions; in one case, staff located and returned a set of tefillin that had been a gift from the owner's parents.

Since 1981, Unclaimed Baggage has held an annual ski sale on the first Saturday in November.

Unclaimed Baggage has several locations in Scottsboro, Alabama (operations, warehouse, e-commerce, etc.), but only one retail store. Unclaimed Baggage also owns a building that houses Reclaimed for Good, its donation operation.

In 2020, Unclaimed Baggage expanded with an online store.

Owner Bryan Owens told NPR, "It's really like an archaeological dig. You open a bag and you can know what kind of fashions people are wearing, even things like cosmetics or technology, things that they're carrying with them. It really is a cross-section of what's going on in America, and really across the world because the airlines are global."

=== Museum ===
The Museum of Found Treasures within the store and features unusual items found in luggage. One display includes props from the 1986 film Labyrinth which arrived in lost bags in 1997. The Jim Henson Company allowed the store to keep the items, which included the puppet Hoggle.

In 2023, the store's first "Found Report" documented trends in luggage contents as well as unusual finds, which included a pole vault pole, two live snakes, and medieval armor.
