= Identification (literature) =

Psychological process of association with a literary character

Identification refers to the automatic, subconscious psychological process in which an individual becomes like or closely associates themselves with another person by adopting one or more of the others' perceived personality traits, physical attributes, or some other aspect of their identity. The concept of identification was founded by psychoanalyst Sigmund Freud in the 1920’s, and has since been expanded on and applied in psychology, social studies, media studies, and literary and film criticism. In literature, identification most often refers to the audience identifying with a fictional character, however it can also be employed as a narrative device whereby one character identifies with another character within the text itself.

Varying interpretations of Freud's original concept of identification are found in literary and film theory traditions, such as psychoanalytic literary criticism, archetypal literary criticism, and Lacanian film analysis, and in the works of prominent theorists and critics such as Northrop Frye, Laura Mulvey, and Christian Metz. Acclaimed filmmaker Alfred Hitchcock used specific camera and acting techniques in his films to incite audience identification with his characters in order to create suspense.

== Origins ==
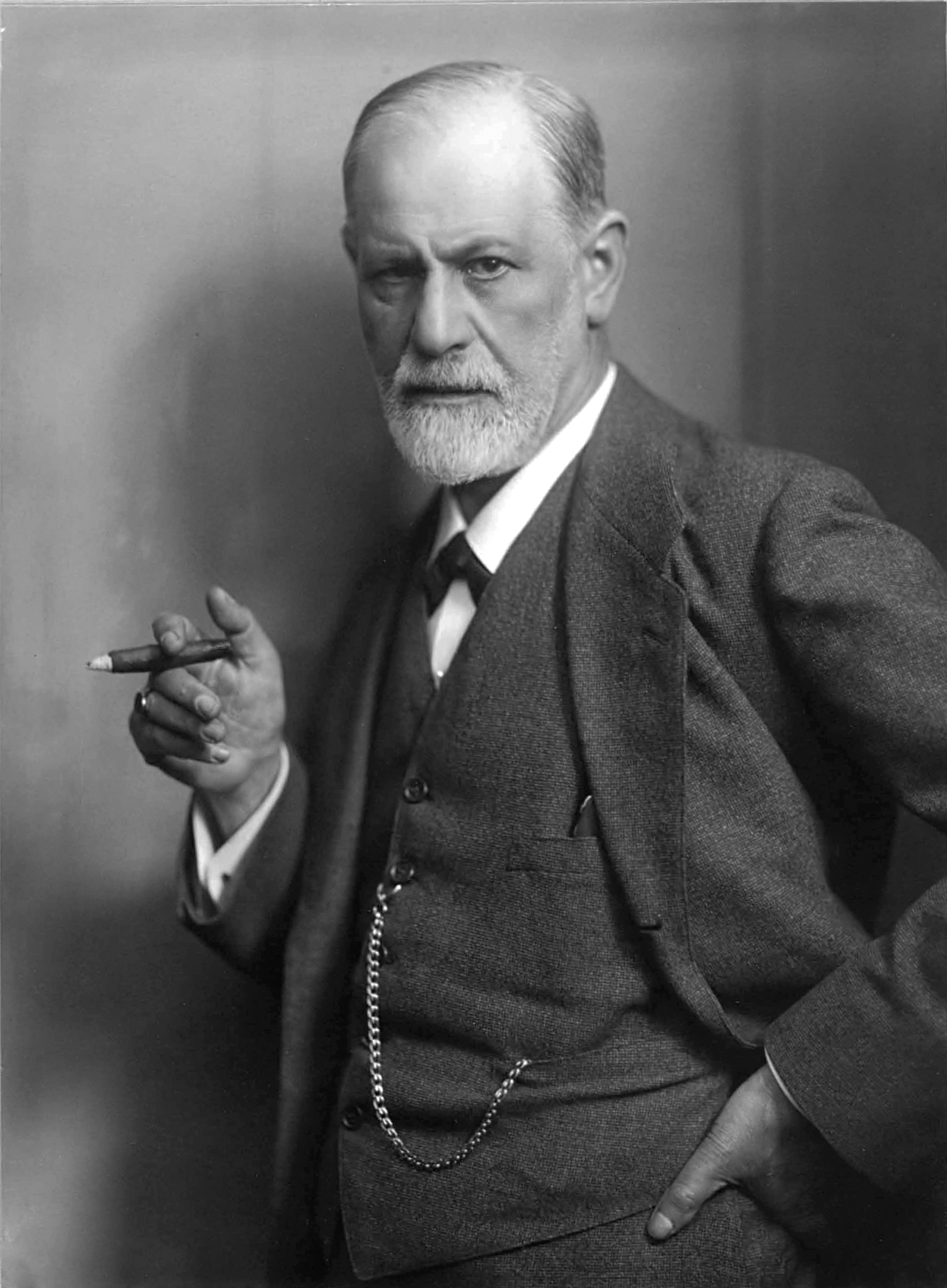
Sigmund Freud circa 1921, Austrian neurologist and the founder of psychoanalysis

=== Freud and psychoanalysis ===
Freud first introduced the concept of identification in his 1921 book Group Psychology and the Analysis of the Ego, where he referred to it as “the original form of emotional tie with an object”. He initially detected the occurrence of identification whilst analysising his patient's dreams for therapeutic purposes. In his later works, he isolated three separate modes of identification: primary identification, hysterical identification, and narcissistic identification.

In Freudian psychoanalysis, identification is largely considered a process "in which something previously experienced as external becomes internal". Primary identification, however, is defined by psychoanalysts as a "state" of experienced oneness with the object, where the distinction between the self and non-self is suspended. According to Freud, hysterical identification is a secondary form of identification, denoting a process whereby a change occurs in the self-concept of the subject so that they become more like the object. Furthermore, narcissistic identification is an aggressive form of identification which follows on from hysterical identification, in which the subject wishes to become the object in order to take its place. Freud states that narcissistic identification is the beginning of the Oedipus complex, in which the child desires to replace their same-sex parent.

Freud applied psychoanalytic techniques to literary texts in the same way that he would analyse his patient’s dreams. Most famously, Freud analysed the Greek tragedy Oedipus Rex by Sophocles in his 1899 book The Interpretation of Dreams, which formed the basis of his controversial theory of the Oedipus complex. Freud claimed that a successful resolution to the Oedipus complex was for the patient to adopt a state of primary identification with their same-sex parent by internalising part of their personality and worldview. For Freud, identification was not only a psychological process, but the way in which the human personality was formed.

== In literary theory ==
=== In psychoanalytic literary criticism ===
Psychoanalytic literary criticism is a method of reading and analysing texts through the lens of psychoanalytic principles. It is largely informed by Freudian psychoanalysis, but has since grown into its own field in literary theory, influenced by the work of psychoanalysts such as Carl Jung, Melanie Klein, and Jacques Lacan.

Identification is a key concept in psychoanalytic literary criticism. Drawing upon the large body of psychoanalytic theory, Merav Roth identified seven forms of identification which can occur whilst reading literature. Among these are; internalised identification, where parts of a character are internalised to become parts of the reader, internalised identification with ‘good’ objects or characters is part of the pleasure of reading and can repair the individuals sense of internal goodness; projective identification, where an individual projects an aspect of themselves onto an object, used to distance oneself from anxiety, readers can project traits onto a character in order to work through them; and intrusive identification, whereby a character penetrates the psyche of the reader, momentarily suspending the reader within the narrative as an extreme form of empathy.

=== In archetypal literary criticism ===
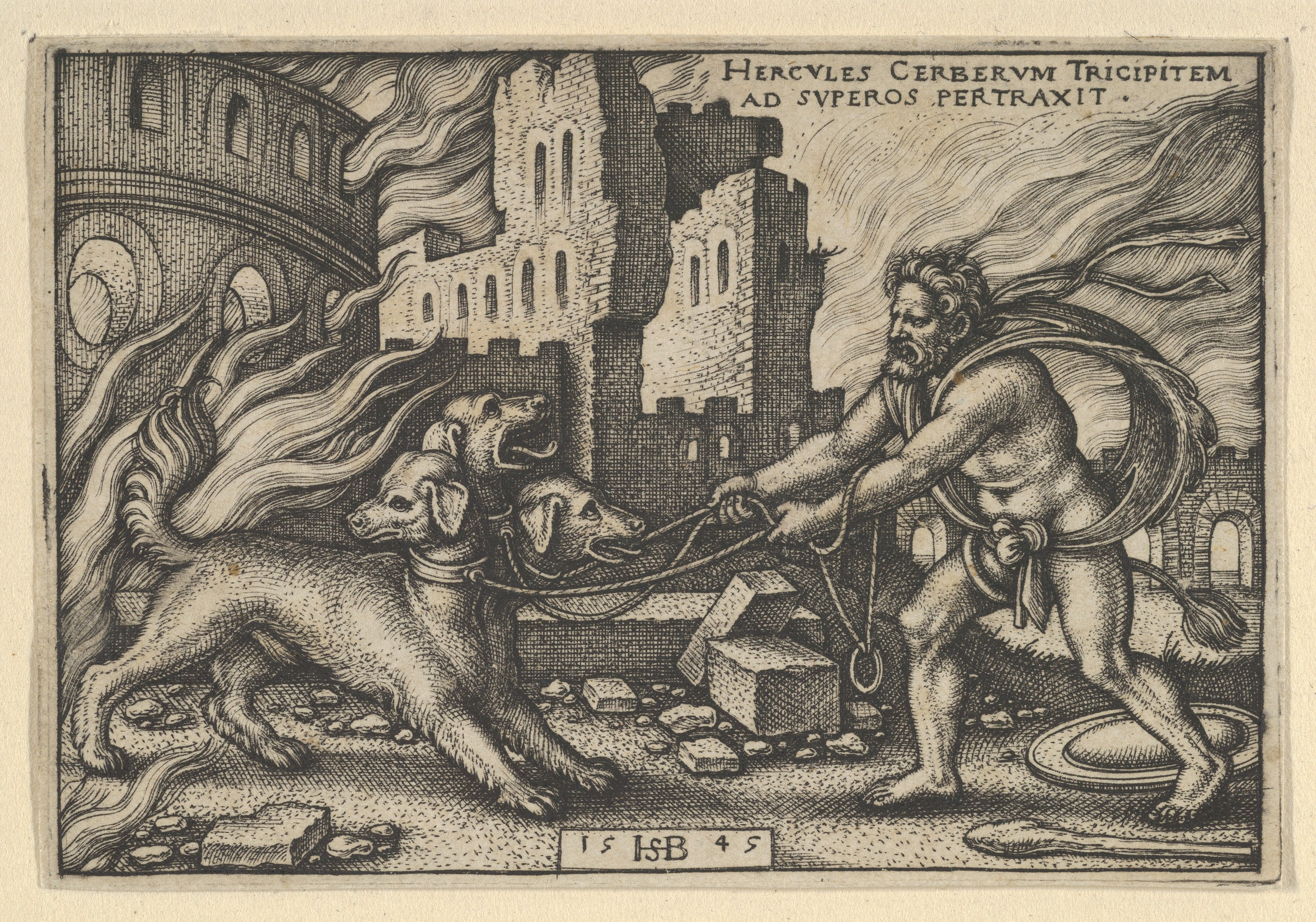
Hercules Capturing Cerberus from The Labors of Hercules, by Sebald Beham (1545) depicts Hercules, the greatest of the Greek heroes, an example of a character which adheres to the hero archetype.

Archetypal literary criticism is a critical framework for literary analysis which draws on the principles of analytical psychology by interpreting texts through the lens of recurring myths and archetypes. Archetypal literary criticism draws heavily on the work of psychoanalyst Carl Jung, a friend and colleague of Freud’s who branched out from Freudian psychoanalysis to establish the field of analytical psychology. In archetypal criticism, identification occurs between the reader and the archetype which a character is modelled from, either knowingly or unknowingly by the author. For the reader to identify with the hero archetype, for example, is a cathartic experience as they are freed from the worries and emotions of their everyday life to momentarily become a powerful hero operating inside a contained fantasy.

Northrop Frye was considered to be one of the most influential literary critics of the 20th century and a pioneering figure of archetypal criticism after Jung. In his 1990 book Words with Power, Frye proposed the literary device of metaphor to be a method of inciting identification in the reader. Frye said that a metaphor not only identifies one thing with another, but both things with the reader, creating an experience of identification which merged the reader with the text.

== In film theory ==
=== In Lacanian film analysis ===
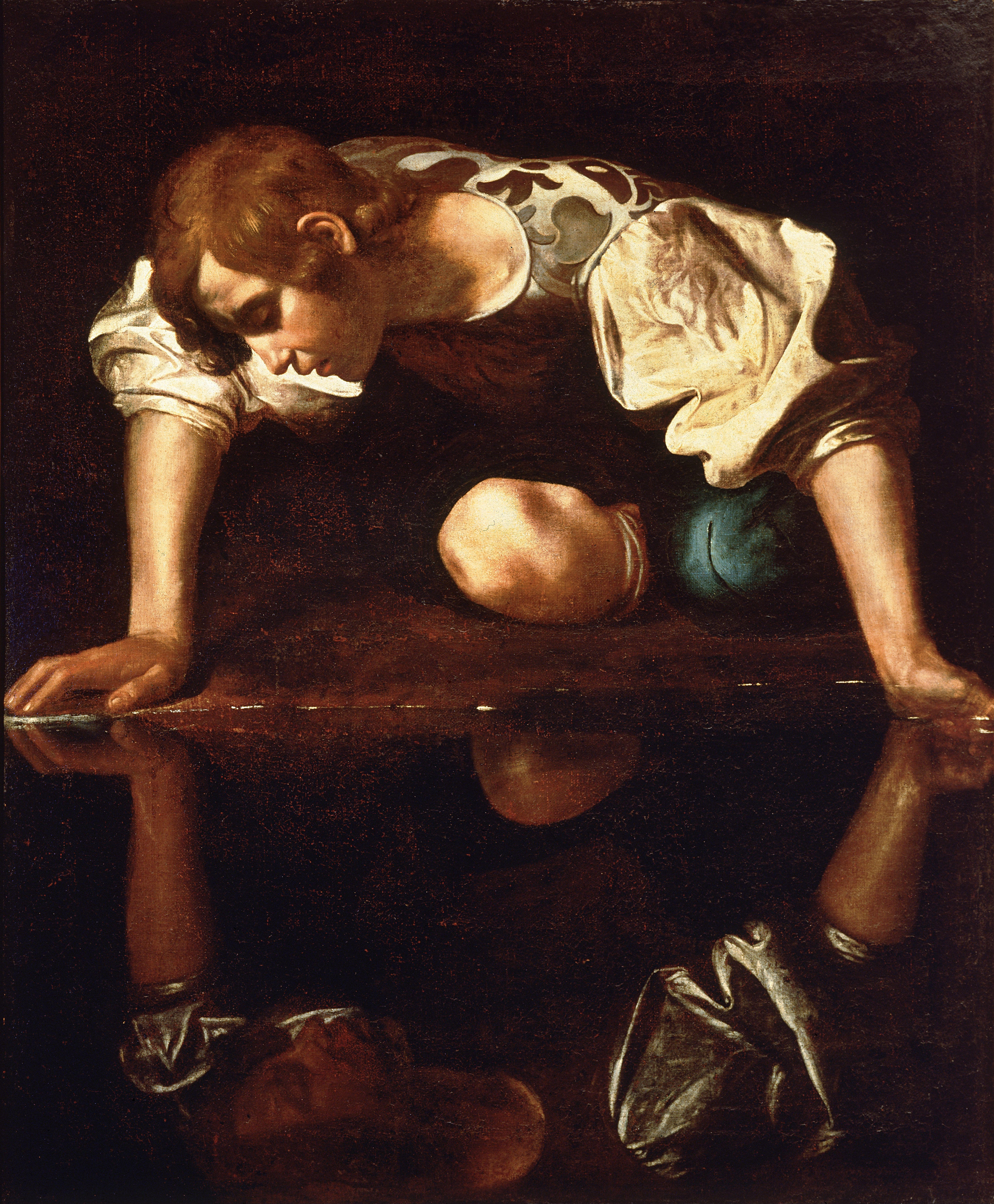
Narcissus by Caravaggio (1594-96) depicts Narcissus gazing at his own reflection demonstrating our fascination with our image as outlined by Lacan's mirror phase.

Jacques Lacan was a French psychoanalyst who, building on the work of Freud, developed a post-structuralist style of psychoanalysis known as Lacanianism or Lacanian theory. Lacanian theory has been adopted by critics as a lens for textual analysis, and is especially popular in film criticism as Lacanianism concerns itself with the highly visual concepts of the gaze, the imaginary and symbolic, and the logic of desire in the visual domain. In traditional Lacanian film theory, the gaze represents a point of identification, where “the spectator invests her/himself in the filmic image”. The spectator identifies with the camera; because they are absent from the screen they are present as the watcher. Lacanian theory claims that this identification with the camera provides the spectator with a sense of imaginary mastery and is the source of the pleasure in watching film.

The mirror phase is one of Lacan’s most influential concepts, and is considered to be the first occurrence of identification in a person's life. It refers to the moment in childhood when an individual first encounters themselves in a mirror and identifies with the image that they see. Lacan argued that this mirror-self is more attractive to the individual than their fragmented, internal sense of self, composed of fluctuating thoughts, emotions, desires, and fears. Thus, in identifying with the mirror-self, the individual forms an ideal version of themselves that is whole and, according to Lacanian theory, exists only in the imaginary.

In Lacanian theory, the mirror phase is the most important occurrence of identification, and is partially re-lived through all subsequent identifications, such as those experienced when watching a film or reading literature. The mirror phase identification is the moment of separation of the ideal fantasy self, similar to Freud’s ego, with the real self, or in other words, the concept of self with the actual self. This concept of self is what is transformed when the spectator identifies with a fictional character.

=== Key theorists and critics ===
==== Christian Metz ====
Christian Metz was a French film critic who applied principles of Saussurean semiology alongside concepts sourced from Lacanian psychoanalysis to analyse film texts. In his seminal work Psychoanalysis and Cinema: The Imaginary Signifier, Metz identifies the pleasure of cinema as something which arises from viewer identification. He states that there are two kinds of identification that occur for the viewer; primary identification, in which the viewer identifies with the camera, and secondary identification, in which the viewer identifies with the characters onscreen. Metz argues that because film can only offer representations of the world, the viewer identifies with the camera as a way to give these representations a sense of realness. In occupying this position, they can experience a temporary satisfaction of their desire for wholeness. Metz states that watching film recreates the initial pleasure experienced during the Lacanian mirror phase, where the viewers identity is distilled into a single image.

==== Laura Mulvey ====
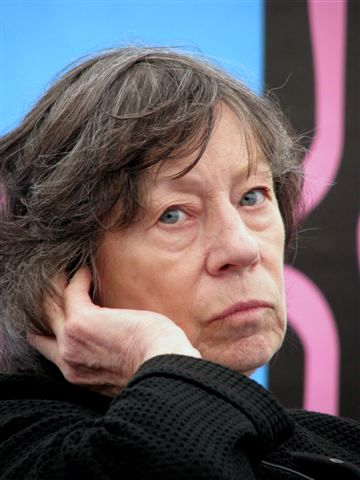
Film theorist Laura Mulvey circa 2010

Laura Mulvey is a British film theorist who uses Freudian and Lacanian concepts to analyse and discuss cinema from a second-wave feminist perspective, citing concepts such as Freud’s idea of phallocentrism and Lacan’s concept of the gaze. Mulvey’s most notable work is her 1975 essay "Visual Pleasure and Narrative Cinema", in which she introduced the concept of gendered gaze, specifically the male gaze, to the field of film theory. She argues that Hollywood films are typically structured around a primary male protagonist with whom the spectator can identify themselves with. As the viewer identifies with this active, controlling agent of the narrative, they derive pleasure from a temporary experience of omnipotence, as the external traits and perceived power of the fictional character are internalised by the viewer. Mulvey states that this identification is fuelled by the ego libido, a drive for self preservation identified by Freud.

== Examples ==
=== In the films of Alfred Hitchcock ===
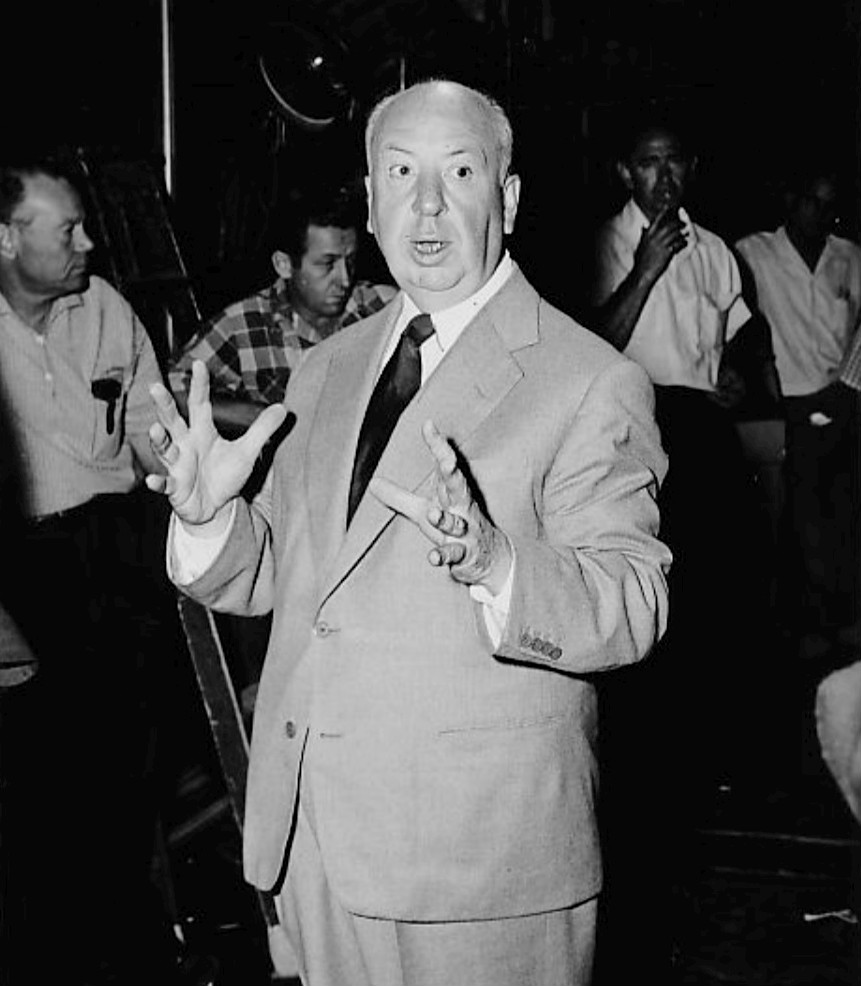
Alfred Hitchcock the "master of suspense", circa 1955

Alfred Hitchcock was an English new wave filmmaker, considered to be one of the most distinguished directors in the history of cinema and nicknamed the "Master of Suspense" for his long career of making thriller films, many of which are critically regarded as masterpieces, such as Rear Window (1954), Vertigo (1958), and Psycho (1960). Hitchcock used the process of viewer identification as a technique to establish suspense, stating that the more invested the audience is in the fate of the character, the more "urgent and keen" a viewing experience.

One way in which Hitchcock established viewer identification in his films was through camera work. Hitchcock pioneered the use of frequent protagonist point-of-view shots, combined with shot/reverse shot sequences between the protagonist's eyes or profile and the object, which worked to keep the audience inside the protagonist's consciousness, thus providing a strong basis for identification. By using restrained acting during facial close-ups and during shot/reverse shot sequences, Hitchcock designed his scenes in such a way that when the camera cut to what the character was looking at, "the viewer would experience the emotion directly, through identification, rather than by observing the actor's artifice of sentiment".

Hitchcock subverted traditional Hollywood films by inciting viewer identification with flawed characters. The "Shower Scene" in Psycho is one of the most iconic scenes in the history of cinema. Critics have argued that this is due to Hitchcock's exploitation of viewer identification. The audience identifies and sympathises with Marion, the female lead, up until the point of her brutal murder in the shower by Norman Bates, in which, according to critic Robin Wood, "Hitchcock uses all the resources of identification to make [the viewer] 'become' Norman". Wood argues that this use of identification is central to Hitchcock's work due to his interest in the "potential for abnormality". Likewise, critic Laura Mulvey stated that Hitchcock used identification to expose the perverted aspects of the audience's consciousness.

== See also ==
- Identification (psychology)
