= Sir Didymus =

- First appearance: Labyrinth (1986)
- Created by: Jim Henson; Brian Froud
- Designed by: Brian Froud
- Portrayed by: Dave Goelz; David Barclay
- Voiced by: David Shaughnessy

In-universe information
- Gender: Male
- Occupation: Knight
- Affiliation: King Jareth
- Nationality: Goblin Kingdom

Sir Didymus is a fictional character in the 1986 fantasy film Labyrinth. An anthropomorphic Fox Terrier knight, he serves as a guardian of the bridge over the Bog of Eternal Stench and becomes an ally to the protagonist, Sarah Williams. Sir Didymus was designed by Brian Froud and portrayed as a puppet, performed primarily by Dave Goelz and voiced by David Shaughnessy.

The character received a positive reception from entertainment critics, who praised his comedically feisty yet chivalrous personality. Sir Didymus appears in the film's adaptations and also features in several original comic short stories published by Archaia.

== Development ==
Labyrinth started as a collaboration between director Jim Henson and conceptual designer Brian Froud following their previous collaboration, The Dark Crystal. Unlike The Dark Crystal, which had featured only puppets, Henson and Froud wanted Labyrinth to include interactions between puppet creatures and human characters, "almost like a throwback to the original Muppet Show", with a greater focus on characters' personalities and relationships. Serving as an obstacle for Sarah to overcome on her quest to reach King Jareth's castle, the jovial, gallant yet feisty Sir Didymus fiercely guards the bridge over the Bog of Eternal Stench, accompanied by his 'steed' Ambrosius, an Old English Sheepdog.

Froud's conceptual paintings initially depicted Sir Didymus as an indeterminate creature with the tail plume of a squirrel, bushy white eyebrows and a long mustache, but as the puppet was developed by Jim Henson's Creature Shop it took on traits of a fox, including auburn fur and a pointed nose. After consultation with Froud, puppet designer Jane Gootnick refined the character to also resemble a Fox Terrier, giving him the ability to bare his teeth, snarl and yap. Froud has acknowledged Sir Didymus is a mixture of a dog and a squirrel, and has also referred to him as a fox in other contexts. Screenwriter Terry Jones claimed that his long-haired Jack Russell Terrier was the inspiration for Sir Didymus; he recalled that during an early meeting about the film Henson "couldn’t take his eyes off" Jones' dog. Henson's daughter Cheryl, who worked as a puppet-maker and puppeteer on Labyrinth, suggested Didymus' personality was influenced by one of their family dogs, a feisty and territorial peekapoo.

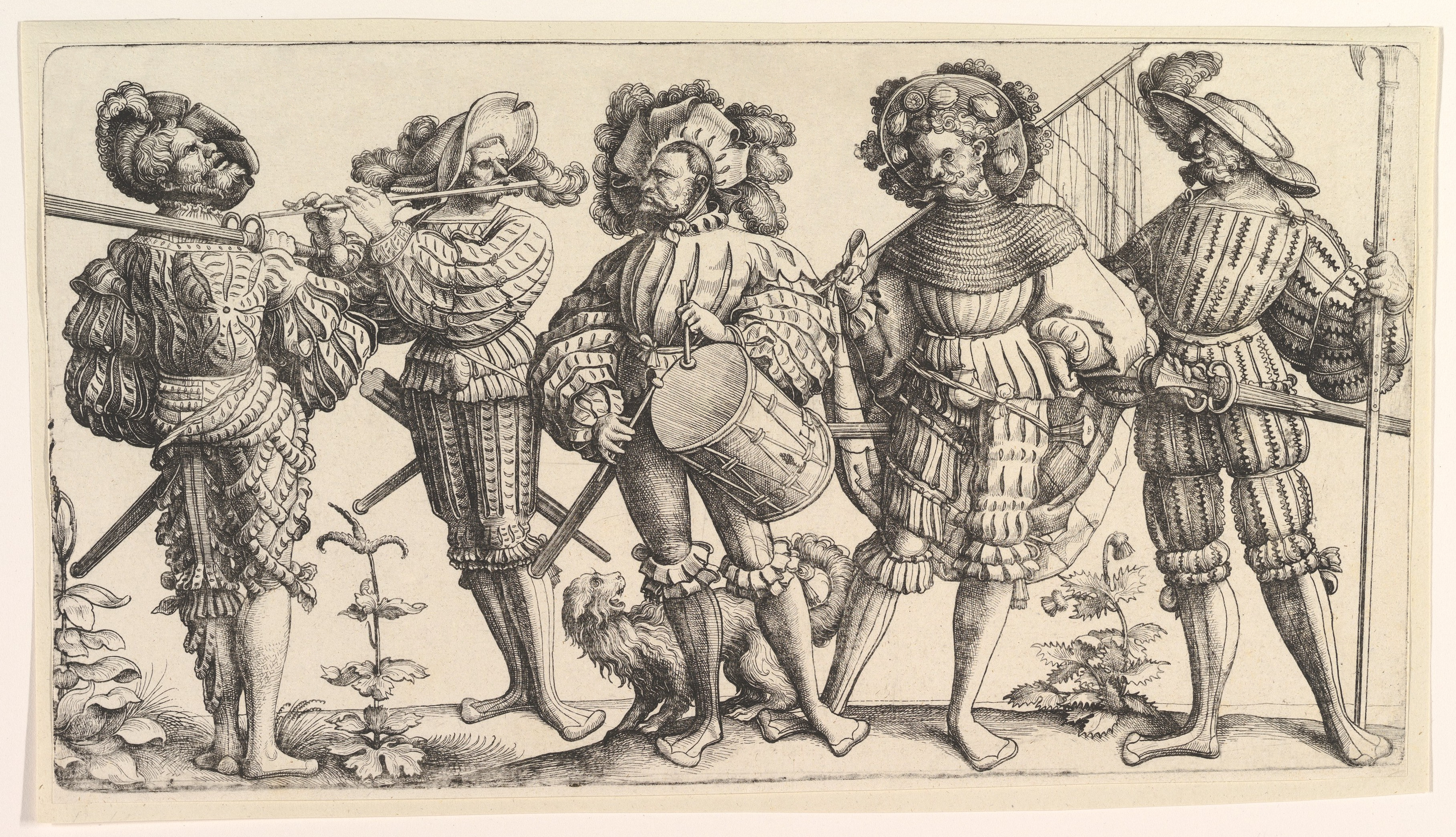
Sir Didymus' costume was designed as a miniaturized version of the medieval German mercenaries called the Landsknechts(depicted above by Daniel Hopfer, c. 1530).

Froud based Didymus' costume design on the Landsknechts, medieval mercenaries that were famous for their very flamboyant attire and large feathered hats. Didymus' colourful wardrobe was created by Polly Smith, and included a yellow feather-plumed velvet hat, a scarlet doublet with chevrons on the sleeves and epaulettes on the shoulders, gauntlet gloves and knee armour. Froud said that the character's black eyepatch "gives him a bit of a rakish quality. It implies that he's had a bit of a past, that he's been in the wars, been up to various things. And he has, but he's probably in retirement now." Didymus' walking stick accessory was inspired by that of the character Yoda in Star Wars; Froud recalled that a stick was puppeteer Frank Oz's solution for working out how to manipulate Yoda, and similarly, for Didymus, "A lot of his character comes from that very simple device. Didymus is very demonstrative with that stick: He's always bashing things or tapping things. Once Yoda had the walking stick, Frank got how he walks [...] That way you suddenly got character, and that's what happened with Didymus, too."

Three different types of puppet were made for the character: a hand-puppet with a foam-latex head and cable-controlled face; a remote radio-controlled armature puppet that could sit on the dog playing Ambrosius; and a marionette for shots showing Didymus' whole body. Rehearsals for the character took three weeks. Didymus' main puppeteer was Dave Goelz, known for performing several Muppets including Gonzo. He was assisted by Karen Prell, David Barclay and Michael Quinn. As one of the more "Muppety" characters in Labyrinth, Henson did not want Didymus' voice to be recognisable as Goelz', so his voice was replaced by David Shaughnessy's post-filming.

Didymus speaks in Elizabethan English. Goelz described the character as "officious, but not all that cognizant of the big picture", with "the sense that the other characters could throw him a curve ball and he wouldn't quite know what to do."

== Reception ==
The character received a positive reception from film critics. "Sir Didymus is a terrier-like, duty-bound royal warrior, and with his English accent and his willingness to charge the enemy, any enemy, he is a winning creation," wrote David Connelly of the Shreveport Journal. Describing the character's appearance as "like a cross between a Yorkshire terrier and a grenadier of the Napoleonic era", Sam Karnick in Chronicles found Didymus to be particularly interesting as he "is the ultimate warhawk but is played as a likable, enthusiastic British gentleman-soldier" and noted that "In contrast to many other filmmakers working today, Henson resists the temptation to play the character as a pathological danger to society." Comparing his persona to Errol Flynn, the French periodical La Revue du cinéma considered Didymus to be one of the film's best achievements.

Odie Henderson of Slant Magazine described Didymus' "absurd cockiness and comical voice" as Pythonesque, as well as his obliviousness to the smell of the Bog of Eternal Stench. He added, "Sir Didymus has aspirations of knighthood, but his violent streak leans more toward Braveheart than King Arthur." Also noting the influence of Monty Python, authors Andrew DeGraff and A. D. Jameson identified Didymus as "a cross between the Black Knight, the Knights Who Say "Ni!" and the killer Rabbit of Caerbannog...mixed with a healthy dose of Fraggle (and Don Quixote)." Jack Edwards of VultureHound called Sir Didymus "electrically eccentric". As "a formidable foe in a tiny package" with enough bravery for someone "twenty times his size ... maybe more", Didymus sends the message of "[n]ot judging ferocity of heart by size/shape", wrote Sarah Godwin of The Mary Sue.

Sir Didymus has been described as a fan favourite. The Guardian ranked him among the five best creatures from 1980s fantasy cinema, writing, "Labyrinth has a cornucopia of magical creatures, but Sir Didymus elevates himself above the rest thanks to his courage, loyalty, and keen sense of style." Calling Sir Didymus and Ambrosius "the most chivalrous fox and most unreliable hound", William Lobley of Empire praised them as an "iconic duo" and "easily two of the most memorable characters" in Labyrinth. Shawn S. Lealos and Glenna Blair of Screen Rant similarly praised them as the film's best comedy duo, attributing this to their "great back-and-forth relationship" and the fact that Ambrosius is a real dog while Sir Didymus is a puppet. They noted that Didymus' frustration at Ambrosius' cowardly behaviour leads to "funny moments" and is an example of the themes of pride and embarrassment in Labyrinth, which are "usually as the subject of humor that thinly veils genuine insecurity".

== Other appearances ==
Sir Didymus appears in Labyrinth's tie-in adaptations, which include the novelisation by A. C. H. Smith and the three-issue comic book adaptation published by Marvel Comics, which was first released in a single volume as Marvel Super Special #40 in 1986. He also appears in the film's picture book adaptation and photo album.

Archaia released a Labyrinth comic short story titled Sir Didymus' Grand Day for Free Comic Book Day on May 4, 2013. Sir Didymus also features in The Right Steed for the Right Deed, a story about how he met Ambrosius, published in the Archaia collection Labyrinth: 2017 Special. The collection Labyrinth: Under the Spell includes The Eternal Tournament, a story about how Sir Didymus came to guard the Bog of Eternal Stench as the prize for winning a tournament for the Goblin King's favor.

Sir Didymus has minor appearances in the four-volume manga sequel Return to Labyrinth (published 2006–2010) and the 12-issue comic series Labyrinth: Coronation (published 2018–2019).
