= Labyrinth: Coronation =

Comic book series

- Cover of Labyrinth: Coronation #1.

Publication information
- Publisher: Archaia Entertainment
- Format: Limited series
- Genre: Fantasy; Adventure
- Publication date: February 2018 – March 2019
- No. of issues: 12
- Main character: Jareth

Creative team
- Written by: Simon Spurrier; Ryan Ferrier
- Artist(s): Daniel Bayliss; Irene Flores; Fiona Staples (cover art)
- Letterer: Jim Campbell
- Colorist: Dan Jackson
- Editor(s): Cameron Chittock; Sierra Hahn

Collected editions
- Volume 1: ISBN 978-1-68415-266-7
- Volume 2: ISBN 978-1-68415-358-9
- Volume 3: ISBN 978-1-68415-449-4

Labyrinth: Coronation is a 12-issue comic book limited series based on Jim Henson's 1986 fantasy film Labyrinth. Published by Archaia Entertainment, it was written by Simon Spurrier and illustrated by Daniel Bayliss, with cover art by Fiona Staples. The first issue was released in February 2018 and new installments were released on a near-monthly basis until the series' conclusion in March 2019. The series has since been collected in three volumes in trade paperback.

A spin-off of Labyrinth, the comic creates a possible origin story for the film's main antagonist, Jareth, the king of the goblins. The series is set within the timeline of the events of the original film, and is framed as a story told by Jareth to his captive baby Toby during their off-screen time together. Beginning in 18th-century Venice, Jareth's tale follows the quest of a young woman, Maria, to rescue her baby son after the child's father sacrificed him to the ancient ruler of the Labyrinth, the tyrannical Owl King. The story is told through unreliable narration from Jareth and a goblin named Beetleglum.

Labyrinth: Coronation received mostly positive reviews from entertainment critics, who praised its artwork, characters and storytelling; however, some did not like the series' ambiguous ending.

== Development ==
Many of the creators of Labyrinth: Coronation were long-time fans of the original film. Writer Simon Spurrier had previously worked with The Jim Henson Company and Archaia Entertainment on The Power of the Dark Crystal, a 2017 comic series based on Jim Henson's 1982 film The Dark Crystal. Having frequently expressed his admiration for Labyrinth, Spurrier immediately accepted the offer of writing a comic based on the film, describing it as "a dream come true".

Labyrinth: Coronation is not official canon to the film, but, according to Spurrier, aims "to tread the tightrope between adoring fanfic[tion] and bolshy iconoclasm." Stating the comic "features entirely new narratives and scenarios" from the film, Spurrier described the writing process as "a case of blasting out a joyous monsoon of ideas and seeing what the rest of the team want[ed] to keep." Labyrinth's large, established fanbase presented many challenges to the project, as the creators anticipated readers of the comic would have "very loaded expectations and concerns". Editor Sierra Hahn stated that Archaia felt pressure to please both fans of Labyrinth and the Jim Henson Company, expressing that what Archaia guessed "Jim Henson would have wanted versus what a fan may want doesn't always align," and it was a challenge to try to balance this in the comic. According to Spurrier, the most "nerve-wracking" aspect was writing scenes with Jareth, "a character eternally associated with the late David Bowie," who portrayed him in the film. Spurrier sought to create answers to questions about Jareth, such as "who he truly is. What he wants. Why he is the way he is. Why's he so hot on barn owls?" To create Jareth's "voice" in the comic, Spurrier listened to "lots and lots and lots" of interview recordings of Bowie.

According to Spurrier, the series features a similar fantasy adventure and has the same "knowing sense of humor" as Labyrinth, but "consciously leans in different thematic directions". He found the ambiguity of Labyrinth was an advantage for him in writing the comic as it allowed him to "ride the concept in [his] own direction for a while without fear of soiling the existing journey nor betraying the canon." Although Jim Henson confirmed in press interviews that the world of the Labyrinth exists in the imagination of the film's protagonist, Sarah, and Jareth "has no reality except what Sarah gives him", the creators of Labyrinth: Coronation decided to "preserve the [film's] elegant ambiguity" about whether the Labyrinth and its inhabitants are real, "while leaning hard into the wonders that arise when Reality Doesn't Matter." According to Spurrier, in the comic, the Labyrinth doesn't exist solely in Sarah's imagination but is "a reactive and plastic environment" which reshapes itself for different people and "exists in part just to present challenges to those who get lost within it."

As the series is set in 18th century Venice, Spurrier and illustrator Daniel Bayliss researched historical Italian styles, architecture and costumes. The series' character Septimus the Night Troll was based on an original design by Labyrinth conceptual designer Brian Froud that did not make it into the film.

Cover art for the series was produced by artist Fiona Staples, with subscription covers by Rebekah Isaacs for the first four issues, Sana Takeda for issues five to eight, and Cory Godbey the last four issues. For the first issue of the series, three variant cover designs were produced by Laurent Durieux, Jill Thompson and Bill Sienkiewicz, with additional event-exclusive covers by Tula Lotay (Fried Pie Convention), David Petersen (ComicsPRO), Benjamin Dewey (Emerald City Comic Con) and Ramon K. Perez (WonderCon).

Labyrinth: Coronation was published on a near-monthly schedule between February 2018 and March 2019. The series was collected into hardcover trade paperback in 2019, and paperback format between 2020 and 2021.

== Plot ==
=== Frame narrative ===
Sarah Williams journeys through the Labyrinth to retrieve her baby brother, Toby, whom she wished away to the goblins. Watching Sarah's progress from the castle at the Labyrinth's centre, Goblin King Jareth tells Toby a story. A goblin servant named Beetleglum, who is tasked with caring for Toby, periodically interrupts Jareth's storytelling, casting doubt on the king's narration and supplementing the story with his own memories, different versions of the events told within.

=== Embedded narrative ===
In Venice in 1797, a young English nobleman named Lord Albert Tyton has spent a year on a hedonistic trip around Europe, ignoring his stern father's demands that he return to England. In Venetian society, Albert and a woman named Maria have been living as a married count and countess with their baby son. Maria was formerly a tavern linen maid, and Albert claims their marriage has been a pretence.

Troubled by his large accruement of scandals and debts, Albert accepts a magical deal from the goblins, who say the Labyrinth's ancient ruler, the Owl King, needs an heir. The goblins covet Albert's noble bloodline and want him to assume the Goblin throne. Afraid of his father discovering his relationship with Maria and the existence of their child, Albert offers his son to the goblins to rule in his stead. Albert decides to return to England without Maria, and tells her that their son will be placed in an orphanage. Maria refuses to give up her son, and when the goblins come to transport the child to the Labyrinth, she begs for him back. Hearing her pleas, the Owl King gives Maria a deal: she must solve the Labyrinth in 13 hours or both she and her son will belong to the Owl King.

Beetleglum is tasked with looking after Maria's baby. Entering the Labyrinth, Maria befriends a goblin knight, Sir Skubbin, after he rescues her from a mermaid. Maria and Skubbin are captured by goblin Trawlers and brought aboard their airship. While escaping the airship, they encounter the Night Troll, Septimus, whom the Owl King sent to kill Maria.

Maria, Sir Skubbin and Tangle, a sentient rosebush rescued from the Trawlers' airship, enter a giant cemetery with a tomb prepared for the Owl King in anticipation of his death. They discover a rebellion is starting among the goblins against the Owl King. Using a piece of chalk that had belonged to her baby son, Maria discovers she has the power to alter reality and matter in the Labyrinth. She meets a pink worm named Cible who offers to accompany her on her quest.

Maria and her friends find the goblins who are planning a rebellion against the Owl King. Skubbin tries to warn Maria about one of the Owl King's traps, but the king appears and praises Skubbin, revealing that Skubbin is his son. Believing Skubbin has betrayed her, Maria runs away into the trap, a magic dream portal. In the dream, Maria finds herself at a masquerade ball dancing with Albert, who apologises for his recent cruel treatment of her. However, the Albert in the dream is only a copy of the real Albert and has been instructed by the Owl King to kill Maria. Initially drawn in by the fake Albert's promises of love, Maria realises she is in a trap and escapes.

Maria encourages the goblin army to join the rebellion against the Owl King. As she reaches the centre of the Labyrinth, it is revealed the Owl King had no intention of making Maria's child his heir but instead plans to magically drain the baby's youth with a magical machine, enabling the Owl King to rule forever. Maria and her friends manage to stop the Owl King's spell and defeat the Owl King, who vanishes. However, Beetleglum explains that since the clock struck 13, the spell has already begun to change the baby, bringing a new balance to the Labyrinth.

Beetleglum informs Maria that she cannot return to the human world with her child, showing her that if she does her family is most likely destined for a tragic end in which Albert dies and Maria and the boy are destitute until Albert's father takes the child away and raises him without Maria. Maria takes her baby and enters the Owl King's machine.

=== Epilogue ===
In the frame narrative, Sarah reaches the centre of the Labyrinth and defeats Jareth, returning home with Toby. Beetleglum asks Jareth what happened to the baby in the story, recalling that soon after Maria entered the machine with her baby, Jareth arrived in the Labyrinth as a fully grown man and assumed the goblin throne. Beetleglum believes that Jareth is Maria's child, but it is not revealed what occurred during the interim. Jareth offers several suggestions, such as that Maria created him with her chalk, that Jareth is the Owl King reincarnated or even the Labyrinth itself, that Maria's baby grew up to be Hoggle the dwarf, or that the baby went home and grew up in the human world.

Jareth enters a portal into a dream, where, it is revealed, Maria has remained with her dream-version of Albert for three centuries.

== Style and themes ==
The series employs an unreliable narrator in Jareth, who is portrayed as being "characteristically slippery" in his telling of Maria's tale, avoiding revealing whether he is the baby featured or whether the story is true at all. Spurrier stated that in the comic, "Jareth is an inveterate trickster and liar, and you can't necessarily believe a bloody word he says." Like Labyrinth, the story is about a child stolen by goblins, but while the original film's plot catalyst is "a young girl's thoughtless caprice", in Labyrinth: Coronation it is a father's shame.

Joey Edsall of NewRetroWave wrote that the comic addresses the theme of social class and "furthers the thematic idea that escapism and wish fulfillment have their limits." Edsall also observed parallels between Albert and Maria's dynamic and that of the film's two leads, writing that the characters' interactions are marked by "Albert being challenged by a strong-willed woman and the extent of his power over her being tested, as the movie takes to a greater length between Jareth and Sarah."

Melissa Prange of Rogues Portal observed similarities in the imagery and character dynamics of the fourth issue to the film Stardust, leading her to note "how much less grimy the world of the comic series is from Labyrinth film [sic]." She described the artwork as having a "storybook nature", with Jareth and the goblins recreated "cartoonishly".

== Release ==
=== Issues ===
Labyrinth: Coronation
Issue #	Release date	Writer	Illustrator	Cover artist	Subscription cover artist	Variant cover artist(s)	Designer	Colorist	Letterer
1	28 February 2018	Simon Spurrier	Daniel Bayliss	Fiona Staples	Rebekah Isaacs	Laurent Durieux; Jill Thompson; Bill Sienkiewicz; Tula Lotay; David Petersen; Benjamin Dewey; Ramon K. Perez	Michelle Ankley	Dan Jackson	Jim Campbell
2	28 March 2018	Simon Spurrier	Daniel Bayliss	Fiona Staples	Rebekah Isaacs		Michelle Ankley	Dan Jackson	Jim Campbell
3	25 April 2018	Simon Spurrier	Daniel Bayliss	Fiona Staples	Rebekah Isaacs		Michelle Ankley	Dan Jackson	Jim Campbell
4	30 May 2018	Simon Spurrier	Daniel Bayliss with Irene Flores	Fiona Staples	Rebekah Isaacs		Michelle Ankley	Dan Jackson	Jim Campbell
5	25 July 2018	Simon Spurrier	Daniel Bayliss with Irene Flores	Fiona Staples	Sana Takeda		Michelle Ankley	Dan Jackson	Jim Campbell
6	22 August 2018	Simon Spurrier	Daniel Bayliss with Irene Flores	Fiona Staples	Sana Takeda		Michelle Ankley	Dan Jackson	Jim Campbell
7	26 September 2018	Simon Spurrier	Daniel Bayliss with Irene Flores	Fiona Staples	Sana Takeda		Michelle Ankley	Dan Jackson	Jim Campbell
8	24 October 2018	Simon Spurrier	Daniel Bayliss with Irene Flores	Fiona Staples	Sana Takeda		Michelle Ankley	Dan Jackson	Jim Campbell
9	19 December 2018	Simon Spurrier	Daniel Bayliss with Irene Flores	Fiona Staples	Cory Godbey		Michelle Ankley	Dan Jackson	Jim Campbell
10	30 January 2019	Ryan Ferrier	Daniel Bayliss with Irene Flores	Fiona Staples	Cory Godbey		Michelle Ankley	Dan Jackson	Jim Campbell
11	27 February 2019	Ryan Ferrier	Daniel Bayliss with Irene Flores	Fiona Staples	Cory Godbey		Michelle Ankley	Dan Jackson	Jim Campbell
12	27 March 2019	Ryan Ferrier	Daniel Bayliss with Irene Flores	Fiona Staples	Cory Godbey		Michelle Ankley	Dan Jackson	Jim Campbell

=== Collected editions ===
Title	Volume #	Collected material	Format	Release date	ISBN
Labyrinth: Coronation	1	Issues #1–4	Hardcover	27 June 2019	ISBN 978-1-68415-266-7
Labyrinth: Coronation	1	Issues #1–4	Paperback	14 May 2020	ISBN 978-1-68415-503-3
Labyrinth: Coronation	2	Issues #5–8	Hardcover	27 June 2019	ISBN 978-1-68415-358-9
Labyrinth: Coronation	2	Issues #5–8	Paperback	3 September 2020	ISBN 978-1-68415-549-1
Labyrinth: Coronation	3	Issues #9–12	Hardcover	31 October 2019	ISBN 978-1-68415-449-4
Labyrinth: Coronation	3	Issues #9–12	Paperback	21 January 2021	ISBN 978-1-68415-614-6

== Reception ==
=== Critical response ===
According to review aggregator Comic Book Roundup, the first issue of the series received an average score of 9.1/10 based on 11 critic reviews. The majority of the reviews were positive. The series as a whole averages 8.4/10, based on 56 critic reviews.

IGN's Jesse Schedeen rated the first issue 8.3/10, and wrote that the series "shows every sign of being a worthy offshoot of the original movie in its first issue." Nicole Drum of ComicBook.com rated the first two issues both 5 out of 5, praising the artwork and storytelling. Big Comic Page's Craig Neilson-Adams questioned whether Jareth needed to be given an origin story, but nonetheless enjoyed the first two issues of the series, rating both 4/5 and calling the comic "an interesting attempt to expand on the already established lore" which "does an impressive job of capturing the charm, humour and all-ages fantasy" of the film. Andy Hall of Comic Crusaders enjoyed the shift in the story to the prequel plotline, writing that it "leav[es] all the problematic moments of the movie behind (along with the musical dance routines)." In a review of the fifth issue, Patrick Hayes of SciFi Pulse wrote, "Like a real labyrinth, one never knows where Spurrier will spin this story next and that makes each installment incredibly readable." Robbie Pleasant of Multiversity Comics liked the use of Jareth and Beetleglum as narrators, writing that it "works well on a few levels" by connecting the parallel progress of Maria and Sarah, as well as showing the "contradictions between what Jareth was told and what Beetleglum saw happen" during Maria's journey.

As the series progressed, reception from critics became more mixed. Reviewing the fourth issue, NewRetroWave's Joey Edsall identified as the comic's main weakness "its reliance on concrete explanations for the dreamlike world" of the Labyrinth, which he felt robs it of mystique, opining that "It's okay to have the labyrinth clearly be a depiction of the adventurer's fears, dreams, and personality, but it's another thing entirely when Maria states plainly that she will concentrate her imagination as they turn a corner or to see the Owl King pulling memories and fears from [Albert]". In a review of the eighth issue, Melissa Prange of Rogues Portal wrote that Jareth's frame-narrative plotline had become somewhat "tedious" and the series had a "tendency to move forward in fits and starts" but "always includes something fun to make it worth reading in spite of its repetition". Reviewing the final issue, Ingrid Lind-Jahn of Major Spoilers wrote, "There were times the series felt like it was just a few issues too long, and moments where the art felt somewhat rushed. Overall it had a good flavor and it introduced some distinctive, flavorful new characters."

The series' ambiguous ending received negative response from some reviewers. Kay Tilden Frost of GeekDad enjoyed the first issue, but by the final installment found the series "went horribly off the rails", writing that the ending was unsatisfying as the story "refuses to answer any of the questions" teased throughout the series about whether or not Maria's baby is indeed Jareth. Frost was also disappointed that Maria "ends up staying ... with her abusive husband, the one who threw her and her son out of the house and started this whole mess." Deron Generally of The Super Powered Fancast was similarly disappointed by the series' conclusion, writing the comic "just falls apart at the end and the final resolution for all of the characters is unsatisfying." Prange found Maria's ending confusing and "lead[ing] to a weird epilogue which ... affects Jareth's characterization in a rather odd way and goes so far as to drastically change the ending of the film". She wrote that by its conclusion, Labyrinth: Coronation "becomes both a prequel and sequel. While the prequel aspects remain a lot of fun, it's the sequel part which causes the comic to breakdown."

The comic's artwork received generally positive reception from critics. Reviewing the first issue, Schedeen praised the goblin designs as "a feast for the eyes" as well as Bayliss' depiction of Jareth, which he wrote "immediately evokes images of Bowie without the book becoming so hung up on photo-realism that the storytelling suffers"; however, he found some panels lacking in background details. Neilson-Adams wrote that Bayliss "nail[s] the distinctive visual style we all closely associate with the movie, adding a real sense of scale to some of the wider shots, and throwing in some fantastic character designs". Lind-Jahn liked the comic's integration of visual motifs from the film, such as owls and crystal bubbles, "used to emphasize the connections between Sarah's story and Maria's story". Edsall wrote that Bayliss' "marriage of the elaborate world of the goblins with that of Victorian Venice is truly impressive" as well as praising Dan Jackson's colours as "strong in both their vibrancy and in the way he plays with lighting sources in a few scenes throughout".

In 2022, Comic Book Resources ranked Labyrinth: Coronation at number three on a list of the "Top 10 Comics Based on Movies".

=== Commercial reception ===
Estimated U. S. sales
Labyrinth: Coronation
Issue	Release month	Estimated sales (Note: Based on Diamond Comics Distributors data)
#1	February 2018	18,432
#2	March 2018	10,991
#3	April 2018	10,111
#4	May 2018	9,909
#5	July 2018	9,813
#6	August 2018	9,616
#7	September 2018	9,129
#8	October 2018	8,885
#9	December 2018	8,389
#10	January 2019	7,870
#11	February 2019	7,717
#12	March 2019	7,569

== See also ==
- Labyrinth (1986 film) § Comic books
