= Jim Henson's Mother Goose Stories =

1988 British-American TV series or programme

- Also known as: Mother Goose Stories
- Starring: Angie Passmore; Karen Prell; Mike Quinn; Mak Wilson
- Countries of origin: United Kingdom; United States
- Original language: English
- No. of seasons: 3
- No. of episodes: 39

Production
- Executive producer: Brian Henson
- Producer: Mark Johnson
- Production location: Toronto
- Camera setup: multi-setup
- Running time: 30 Minutes
- Production companies: Jim Henson Productions; Television South West

Original release
- Network: Children's ITV on ITV
- Release: 1988 – 1988
- Network: The Disney Channel
- Release: August 25, 1990 – 1993

Jim Henson's Mother Goose Stories is a children's television show hosted by Mother Goose, who tells her three goslings the stories behind well-known nursery rhymes.

== Production ==
The show featured child actors and elaborate puppets created by Jim Henson's Creature Shop. The show featured puppeteers Mike Quinn, Mak Wilson, and Karen Prell as various characters, along with Angie Passmore as the titular Mother Goose.

Fourteen of the episodes were based on stories in L. Frank Baum's 1897 book Mother Goose in Prose, while the others were original tales written for the show. The general look of the characters was based on the work of Maxfield Parrish, the artist who illustrated Baum's book.

The series was originally conceived as a co-production between the Jim Henson Company and Television South West for British television and was first broadcast on Children's ITV in the UK in 1988. A pilot episode, the story of "Humpty Dumpty", was produced in 1987 along with other episodes. The series was considered for a network slot in 1987, but was passed on. The first release of the series came in 1988 through a home video release as part of Jim Henson's Play-Along Video series. The video featured three episodes of the show, "Little Miss Muffet", "A Song of Sixpence" and "Boy Blue", plus original linking footage between each story.

The series finally found a home as a broadcast series on The Disney Channel starting on August 25, 1990, and was the company's first new television series to debut after the death of Jim Henson. Mother Goose Stories had three production seasons, spawning thirty-nine eight-minute episodes. For airing on The Disney Channel, the 39 independently produced episodes were grouped into 13 broadcast episodes to fit the half-hour time slot. Each of these broadcast episodes was composed of three separate stories (with individual opening titles and closing credits attached to each one). The show continued to air on The Disney Channel until 1993. As of July 2025, the series is featured on the Yippee TV streaming service.

The first and third seasons of Mother Goose Stories were directed by Brian Henson, in one of his earliest directorial efforts for The Jim Henson Company, while Michael Kerrigan directed the episodes in the second season. Henson and Kerrigan received a Daytime Emmy Award for Outstanding Directing in a Children's Program for their work on the show.

A video of the series was also released by CEL Home Video in Australia along with several other films and TV shows from The Jim Henson Company.

== Plot ==
Mother Goose tells her three goslings the stories behind well-known nursery rhymes and fairy tales; examples include "Old King Cole," "Eenie Meenie," and "Little Nut Tree."

== Episodes ==
=== Season 1 (1988) ===
1. "Little Miss Muffet"
2. "A Song of Sixpence"
3. "Boy Blue" (19 September 1988)
4. "Little Bo Peep"
5. "Old King Cole"
6. "Hey, Diddle Diddle"
7. "Humpty Dumpty"
8. "Hickory Dickory Dock"
9. "Little Jack Horner"
10. "The Prince and the Beggars"
11. "Baa Baa Black Sheep"
12. "Mary, Mary"
13. "Tommy Tucker"

=== Season 2 (1991) ===
1. "Eenie Meenie"
2. "Dicky Birds"
3. "The Crooked Man"
4. "Mother Hubbard"
5. "Eensy Weensy Spider"
6. "Hector Protector"
7. "Mary's Little Lamb"
8. "Duke of York"
9. "Pat-a-Cake"
10. "Jack Be Nimble"
11. "Willie Winkie"
12. "The Man in the Moon (nursery rhyme)"
13. "Jack & Jill"

=== Season 3 (1992) ===
1. "The Queen of Hearts"
2. "Hickety Pickety"
3. "Pussy Cat, Pussy Cat"
4. "Peter, Peter Pumpkin Eater"
5. "Ride a Cock Horse to Banbury Cross"
6. "It's Raining, It's Pouring"
7. "The Giant"
8. "Tommy Tittlemouse"
9. "Little Nut Tree"
10. "Little Girl with a Curl"
11. "Twinkle, Twinkle, Little Star"
12. "Margery Daw"
13. "Rub a Dub Dub"

== Cast ==
=== Puppeteers ===
- Angie Passmore - Mother Goose
- Karen Prell - Yellow Gosling, Cat (ep. 5), Cow (ep. 11), Little Boy Blue's Mother (ep. 11), Peter the Dicky Bird (ep. 15), Topiary Peacock (ep. 15), Old Mother Hubbard (ep. 17), Peter's Wife (ep. 30)
- Mike Quinn - Brown Gosling, Humpty Dumpty (ep. 1), King (ep. 1), Sheep (ep. 11), Paul the Dicky Bird (ep. 15), Barkley the Dog (ep. 17)
- Mak Wilson - Gold Gosling, Coutchie-Coulou (ep. 1), Speckled Hen (ep. 1), Squire (ep. 11), Royal Gardener (ep. 15), Butcher (ep. 17), Sherlock Hubbard (ep. 17), Man in the Moon (ep. 25)

=== Guest stars ===
- Joseph Arton - Gilbert Filbert (Man in the Moon)
- Katy Boughton Smith - The Princess (Humpty Dumpty)
- Simon Bright - Tom (Little Nut Tree)
- James Conway - The Prince / Prince Lilimond / Page Boy (Humpty Dumpty / The Prince and the Beggars / Old King Cole)
- Natasha Dilleyston - Mary / Little Bo Peep (Mary, Mary / Little Bo Peep)
- Paul Dillon - Jack Horner (Jack Horner)
- J.J. Flynn - Boy (Pat a Cake)
- Alani Gibbon - Ella (Pussy Cat, Pussy Cat)
- Laura Goodwin - May / Miss Muffet / Lucy / The Princess / Stella (Hickory Dickory Dock / Miss Muffet / Eenie Meenie / Dicky Birds / Twinkle Twinkle)
- James Goodwin - Boy / Tom (Jack Be Nimble / Wee Willie Winkie)
- Naomi Kerbel - Mary (Mary's Little Lamb)
- London Kim - The Candlestick Maker (Rub a Dub Dub)
- Luke Marcel - Nicholas (Banbury Cross)
- Ilan Ostrove - The Little Boy / Giligren (Baa Baa Black Sheep / Song of Sixpence)
- Laura Penta - Ella (Tommy Tittlemouse)
- Sam Preston - The Knave of Hearts / Prince Freddy (The Queen of Hearts / It's Raining, It's Pouring)
- Katie Rhodes - Princess Ella / Heather Hubbard / Princess Jill (Crooked Man / Mother Hubbard / Jack and Jill)
- Victoria Shalet - Dorothy / Jenny (The Giant / The Little Girl with the Curl)
- Alexandra Staden - Rachel (Hickety Pickety)
- Toby Uffindell-Phillips - Youngblood (Duke of York)
- Anthony Walters - Little Tommy Tucker / Little Boy Blue / Bobby / Wriggly Squiggly / Peter's son (Tommy Tucker / Boy Blue / Hey Diddle Diddle / Crooked Man / Peter Pumpkin Eater)
- Michelle Wesson - Alice / Emily (Eensy Weensy / Hector Protector)
- Nadia Williams - Margery Daw (Margery Daw)

== Awards ==
Daytime Emmy Awards

- Outstanding Directing in a Children's Series (Brian Henson, Michael Kerrigan)
- Outstanding Achievement in Costume Design (Mark Storey, Jacqueline Mills, Jill Thraves)
