= Construction Site =

British children's television series

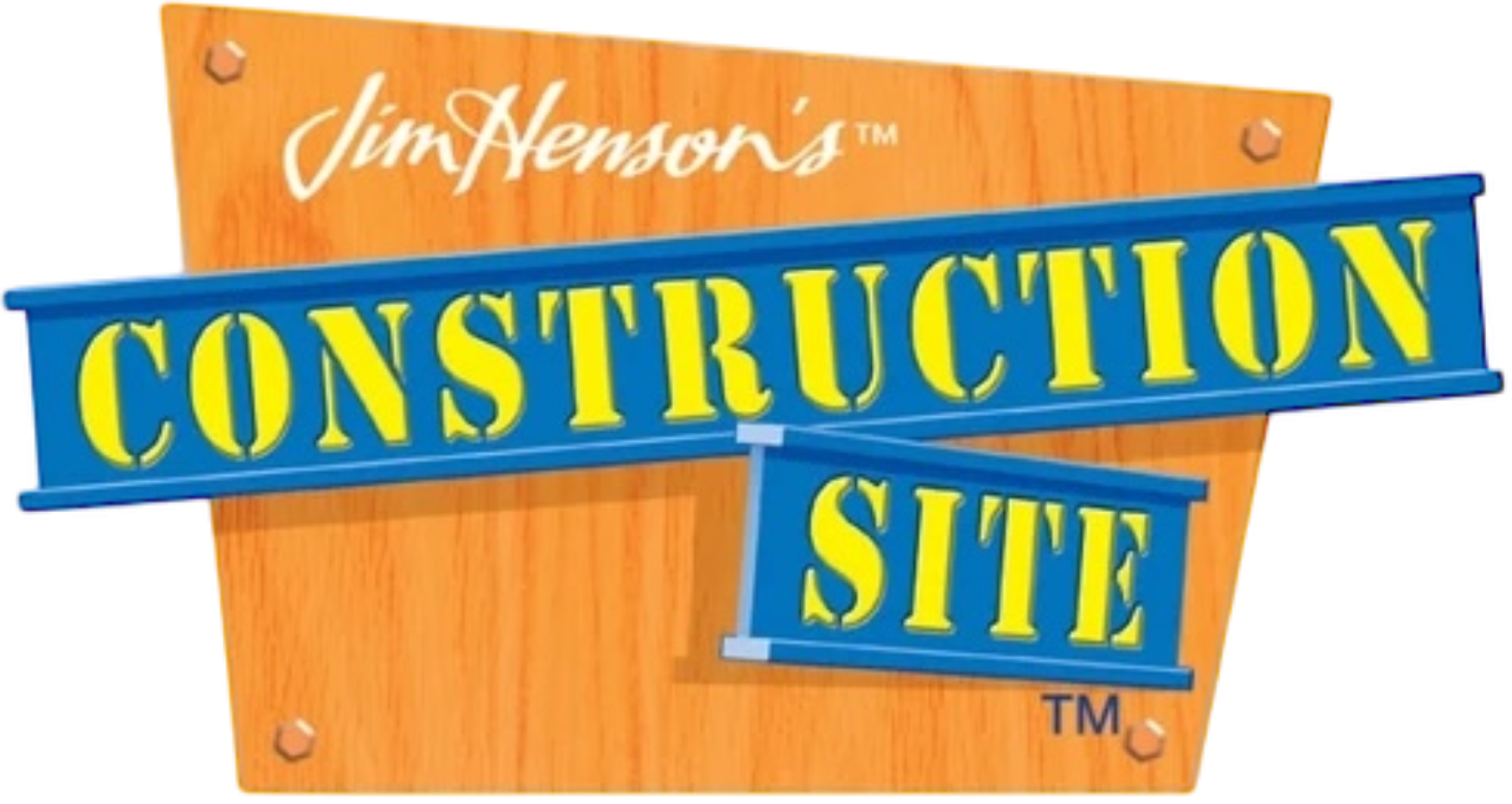
- Genre: Children's television series
- Developed by: CITV
- Starring: Brian Herring; Mark Jefferis; Mak Wilson; Charlotte Bellamy; Angie Greaves
- Opening theme: That's What They Do (short version) by Mark Jefferis (Seasons 3 and 4)
- Ending theme: That's What They Do (different version) by Mark Jefferis (Seasons 3 and 4)
- Composer: Ed Welch
- Country of origin: United Kingdom
- Original language: English
- No. of seasons: 4
- No. of episodes: 52

Production
- Executive producer: Angus Fletcher
- Producer: Sue Taylor
- Running time: 10 mins
- Production company: The Jim Henson Company

Original release
- Network: ITV (CITV)
- Release: September 10, 1999 – March 9, 2002

Construction Site is a British live action children's television series created by The Jim Henson Company in 1999, featuring a group of seven anthropomorphic construction vehicles. It was originally produced for and shown on CITV starting on September 10, 1999. On March 9, 2002, it was nominated for a Children's BAFTA for the Best Pre-School Live Action. Two 13-episode seasons were produced. Episodes are packaged as 52 x 10' or 13 x 26'. The show had a range of video releases by Universal Australia. As of July 2025, the series is featured on the Yippee TV streaming service.

== The characters ==
The main characters consist of a range of different construction equipment. They are as follows:

- Diggs (Brian Herring) - A blue male backhoe loader. He is the main protagonist of the show.
- Bozer (Mark Jefferis) - A red male bulldozer. He is the team leader of the construction machines and speaks with a Scottish accent.
- Scooch (Mak Wilson) - An orange male dumper. He is best friends with Diggs and Carrie and the smallest vehicle in the group. He speaks with a Welsh accent.
- Carrie (Charlotte Bellamy) - A purple female forklift truck. She is best friends with Diggs and Scooch.
- Carle (Mark Jefferis) - A green male crawler crane. He speaks with a German accent.
- Lug (Mak Wilson) - A yellow male dump truck.
- Maxine (Angie Greaves) - A bronze female cement mixer. She serves as a motherly figure to the younger machines and speaks with a Caribbean accent.
- Skatch (Steven Kynman) - An orange male dumper identical to Scooch who speaks with an Australian accent. He only appeared in the episode "Emission Impossible".

There were also mentioned characters that never appeared on screen:

- Flatty the Flatbed
- Big Rig the Supertruck - A semi truck that is said to be a superhero within the universe of the show.
- Chips the Woodchipper - Big Rig's side kick.
- The Abominable Snowplow - The arch enemy of Big Rig.
- Dumper the Jumper Truck
- Gertie the Dump truck - A yellow female dump truck identical to Lug who was Carle's former friend.
- Kevin the Crane
- Truckzilla - A fictional monster thought up by Diggs to scare Carrie and Scooch.
- Roley the Steamroller - A steamroller that was said to have frozen after not taking antifreeze. It is unknown if this is a reference to the Bob the Builder character of the same.

== Episodes ==
=== Season 1 (1999) ===
1. "What I Do Best" – When Diggs starts treating every-day jobs on the construction site as a competition, Bozer decides to introduce a real contest - the Machine Challenge! When Diggs loses the lifting challenge and the roll and dump, he starts to think that maybe he's no good at anything - until the speed loading challenge that is! Winning that teaches the little digger that everyone is good at something.
2. "What's the Plan?" – The machines are laying out the site for a new park When Diggs and Scooch see the plans they figure they can save Bozer some time and just get on with it themselves. But when they manage to dig a perfectly good pond - in completely the wrong place - it's going to take some clever thinking to solve the problem before Bozer finds out.
3. "Idle Time" – When there's cement mix to be moved and Carrie's feeling fired up, nothing can stop her - nothing except a flat battery that is! Luckily it's Maxine that finds her when she's stuck out in the loading area because it's Maxine that knows what she needs - some idle time! Carrie soon learns that although it's always fun to race, sometimes it's even more fun to put your forks up and snooze.
4. "Listening Troubles" – When Bozer tells Diggs that he's full of good ideas he thinks he'll share them with Scooch and Carrie. But it seems that Carrie's got a few good ideas of her own and they're soon disagreeing about just whose idea really is the best. It's not until Bozer points out that listening to others is often the source of the very brightest ideas that Diggs sees that his and Carrie's ideas are not so different after all.
5. "There's No Place Like Home" – Carl is preoccupied because he is missing the site where he was made. When he almost drops a sewer pipe on Diggs, the other machines decide to try and cheer him up. When he sees a little bit of 'Carl World' that they've re-created - including Lug dressed up a Gertie, his dump-truck friend from years gone by, Carl is quite overcome. When you're busy thinking about all your old friends, sometimes it takes a surprise to make you realise how important your new friends are.
6. "Loud and Clear" – Everybody's reversing warning is clear and impressive - everyone's except Scooch that is. When his voice is too quiet to stop Lug reversing into a hold he thinks that the older truck will never forgive him. However, once Bozer teaches him how to be loud and clear, Scooch turns out to be the one who saves Lug from a much worse fate.
7. "Big Rig" – Lug finds it easy to scoff when he sees the newer machines playing at being Big Rig - the superhero truck - everybody knows there is no such thing as "extra vroom". But when Bozer sends him to an unexplored dumpsite and he begins to sink into the unstable ground he soon finds out that there may be just a little bit of Big Rig in all of us.
8. "Who's the Boss?" – Carrie thinks she'd make just as good a boss as Bozer and when he gives her the chance she's determined to prove it. But when the big stones she picks to make concrete jam Maxine's mixer it seems she may have been trying too hard. Bozer finds an answer to the problem but poor Carrie is feeling disappointed until he points out that all he's done is put her ideas into practice. She may not be a boss just yet... but one day she will be!
9. "From Start to Finish" – Diggs, Carrie and Scooch are tired of the old machines always telling them what to do. So when Bozer gives them a whole job to complete all on their own, at first they're sure they can see it through. It all goes pretty well until Carrie lures her friends into a game of 'can't catch me'! They forget all about their work until the sire whistle blows. The job is not finished! But Bozer gives them another chance and this time they are going to make sure they earn a ten horn salute.
10. "Feeling Flat" – Scooch would like to find something he can do that Diggs can't. But when he tries to max out his maximum load all he ends up with is a flat tyre. A little time spent alone at the tyre port and a visit from his friend makes Scooch realise that he doesn't have anything to prove and that as far as the others are concerned he will always be a top truck.
11. "Grown Up for a Day" – When Diggs saves Carl from a nasty accident, the older machines decide it's time he started hanging out with them. Even the chance to play with Carrie and Scooch can't distract Diggs from his proud new position. Not until Lug and Carl start telling long, dull stories about past jobs that is! When he sees his friends enjoying a game of Hot Chunk, Diggs realises that there is plenty of time for growing up!
12. "A Good Mixer" – The new machines have a lot of bricks to move, so many in fact that Diggs thinks they could use a little help from Maxine. Trouble is, when Maxine gets excited, she starts to mix. And what do you get if you mix bricks? Broken stones!! So it's lucky that Bozer needs a load of gravel or they might just have found themselves in a load of trouble.
13. "Look What I've Got" – Diggs has a shiny new attachment and is very proud of it. That is until Bozer tells him it's needed on an important new job and Diggs realises that he doesn't know what it does! Carl thinks it's a Jibber and Lug thinks it's a Dipper, but no-one is really sure. When the job starts and it comes to Diggs' turn, it's only by accident that he learns he's got a Holer. He learns something important, too – never throw away instructions!

=== Season 2 (2000) ===
1. "Carrie's Pallets" – Carrie is a little jealous when the bigger machines get to landscape a new park so she decides to invent her own fork-lifting style. But Bozer thinks her spiral pallet piling is dangerous and when she stacks pavement stones for the park like a deck of cards disaster is not far away! It's going to take some inspiration from Maxine to turn a useless pile of broken slabs into proof that there is room for a different way on a Construction Site.
2. "One Little Word" – Bozer gives Scooch the morning off so he'll be rested for a big job in the afternoon. But when the other machines ask for his help, his rest turns into helping everyone else! As Maxine says - when you're trying to dump dirt, carry scrap to the landfill, and stop Carrie being scared in the old warehouse all at the same time, there's one little word that may come in handy - No!
3. "Bozer's Boo Boo" – When Diggs discovers that Bozer has accidentally dozed a load of gravel over some important bridge rods he faces a dilemma. With Carl stuck on the bridge, those rods need to be found soon - but how do you tell the boss that he's made a mistake? Of course, he might just be forgetting what kind of boss Bozer is.
4. "Every Dumper's Dream" – When Lug tells Scooch that grading a road on your own is what every dumper dreams of, the little dump truck decides to do a bit of solo grading himself. But Scooch soon finds himself in trouble and trapped on a mountain ledge. The only truck that might hear his cries is Lug, but that means interrupting the grading and ending his dream. Scooch soon realises that some dreams are a little bigger than others.
5. "I'm Having Fun Now" – Diggs' job doesn't seem as much fun as Carrie and Scooch's. Moving piles of stones from one place to another is just boring. But when Carrie takes Diggs' job over while he is having a break to put up some road signs he's soon jealous - especially when Carrie shows him that even boring jobs can be made exciting when you turn them into a game.
6. "Mine All Mine" – Bozer makes Diggs the Team Leader when the new machines get the job of clearing out an old mine. Unfortunately Digg's takes clearing a bit too far away and tips out all the mine supports. He's sure that there's no time for thinking, trapped in the collapsed mine with the strange sounds of the mine-monsters all around, but it's Scooch's thinking that gets them out in the end.
7. "Silencers Are Golden" – Carl and Lug have had a bit of a falling out and have even stopped talking to each other. Even though Bozer tells him it's better to leave them to sort it out on their own, Diggs just can't stop himself trying to help them make up. It's the trouble he gets into while trying that just so happens to show the two old friends how much happier they can be when they work together.
8. "Space Invaders" – Scooch would like a bit more space in the idle house, but Diggs and Carrie aren't giving an inch. But when he is the first to take up residence in the new site building, it's Scooch that ends up allocating space. And it's surprising just how much room a little dumper and his rock collection can take up.
9. "Going Solo" – While Bozer is off-site, Diggs, only half-listening to Maxine, thinks she has told him it's OK to do a job on his own. After all, he can dig and carry and dump so why shouldn't I get all the credit! Diggs however soon learns that teamwork is really the only way to get the job done properly.
10. "Crane of the Year" – Carl has to knock a chimney down on the site today, giving him a chance to show why he is nominated for Crane of the Year. But when, after 25 swings, he still hasn't hit it, he loses his confidence. It's going to take some serious coaching from Carrie to convince him that he is still in with a chance. In the end, it's seeing her determination that makes him realise that the worst thing to be is a quitter.
11. "Building Bozer" – When Diggs overhears Bozer talking to himself, it seems that their beloved boss is going to be leaving. What can the construction machines present him with as a farewell gift? The land-fill site is chock full of bits and pieces that provide some artistic inspiration. But before building for a boss is supposedly leaving, perhaps an eavesdropping digger should check his facts.
12. "Emission Impossible" – A new dumper has come to the site - Sketch. He's so exciting and so much fun that Diggs and Carrie seem to be ignoring their old pal, Scooch. But when one of Skatch's games leaves them stranded without any power, Diggs and Carrie discover what makes a true friend.
13. "Frozen Bozer" – It's very cold today and Bozer reminds the machines to put in their anti-freeze. The trouble is, he's so busy reminding everyone else that he forgets to put some in himself. Diggs, not wanting Bozer to be embarrassed is determined to put in some anti-freeze without anyone knowing, but sometimes when you're in a rush, it's hard to keep a secret.

=== Season 3 (2001) ===
1. "Cool Fuel" – The machines must clear an old dumpsite to make way for a new car park in just one day. Bozer gives the machines a new batch of fuel as a treat but because Carrie is an electric machine she misses out - while the others enjoy their treat together Carrie worries because she is 'difierent'. But, when the new fuel turns out to be a bad batch and all the machines have to be cleaned out, it's down to Carrie alone to get the job done and save the day. As the others praise her for a job well done, she realises that sometimes being different isn't so bad after all.
2. "The Way of the Bodger" – Diggs and Scooch are working on some foundations and are tired and fed up. When Maxine and Lug start to reminisce about their younger days when they would 'bodge' a job to get it done more quickly, Diggs believes he's on to a winner. On his next job he digs a very mediocre hole which Scooch then fills in -finishing the job in record time. When Bozer drives over to test the foundations and sinks however, Diggs quickly learns the merits of doing a job property.
3. "Big Bozer Is Watching" – When Scooch spills some salt grit, Diggs fills his head with the notion that it is 'unlucky', so when Bozer tells them they are working on top of a very high building, Scooch is terrified. There is a camera feed from the top of the building to a TV below so Bozer asks Carl and Lug to keep an eye on the little machines. And they certainly make for some great viewing as Scooch's worst fears are realised when the lift malfunctions setting him up for a very bumpy ride!
4. "Truckmate" – Diggs is jealous when Scooch chooses to work with Carrie instead of him. In an attempt to win back his friend's allegiance, Diggs performs his best Carrie voice while silhouetted behind some tarpaulin. 'Carrie' informs Scooch that in fact 'Diggs is the cleverest machine on the site, more so than Bozer even'. When Bozer and the real Carrie arrive, Diggs is exposed and given a stern telling off. But they do all agree on one thing, Diggs is very clever at doing voices.
5. "Out with the Old" – Bozer tells the machines that 'it's out with the old and in with the new' as they are about to construct their first prefabricated building. When Scooch goes to tell Carl and Lug, they misunderstand and assume that Bozer means that Carl and Lug - being old - are finished. The two old friends pack their bags and leave the site. In an attempt to save them, the younger machines take the prefab building apart. When Bozer finds them, he explains the misunderstanding and goes after the only two machines who can put the building back up. Carl and Lug of course!
6. "Junkyard" – It's getting dark. Bozer asks Scooch to take some rubble to the junkyard and Carrie and Diggs decide to go along too. Diggs frightens the other two with made up tales of 'Truckzilla'- an old machine that comes out at night looking for small trucks to crunch into a million pieces. Once at the junkyard surrounded by machine parts, they see the silhouette of a strangely shaped truck. All, including Diggs, are now convinced that Truckzilla really does exist. When Carrie backs into a ditch and gets stuck, Diggs is too scared to help her. Luckily, Carl arrives and puts the floodlights on. Truckzilla turns out to be no more than a pile of old trucks bits after all.
7. "Carnival Capers" – It's Maxine's 'mileage day'. Bozer enlists the help of the other machines to organize a Carnival Party to celebrate, but it has to be a surprise because Maxine doesn't usually celebrate her Mileage Day and she doesn't like being made a fuss of. While Bozer, Lug and Carl transform themselves into the best looking carnival floats around, Diggs, Carrie and Scooch set about organising the music and the venue. Will Maxine find out before she's supposed to and when she does, will she be pleased or peeved?!!
8. "Almost Famous" – When Diggs, Carrie and Scooch dig a trench in the wrong place, they think they've struck oil. Diggs and Carrie instantly abandon their duties and plan their new life as famous oil barons. But it's not long before Bozer brings them back down to the earth with a bump. He informs them they actually only hit the old oil tank they were supposed to be digging around. Not only are they not rich and famous, but they have to spend the rest of the day cleaning up the nasty oily mess...
9. "Tread Carefully" – Diggs pleads with Bozer to let him wear some new, really fashionable treads. After tearing down an old warehouse, Bozer asks Diggs to check inside the old water cooler before Carl demolishes it. Diggs confides to Scooch that his new treads are really hurting him so Scooch offers to go in his place. When Bozer sees Diggs appear, he gives Carl the all clear to begin the wrecking, not realising Scooch is still inside the cooler. Despite the pain he is in, Diggs races to the rescue and gets Scooch out in the nick of time. High fashion is not always a good thing in the workplace...
10. "A Riveting Story" – Carrie and Diggs are scouting for rivets for their collections when Bozer telis everyone that today's job is to clear out an old dock. Carl is to lift the smaller machines in the dock to start the clearing. While in the dock, Carrie spots a trunk full of rivets and greedily tries to pick the whole lot up with her forks. Accidentally, she rams the side of the dock and water starts to pour in. After a heart stopping rescue by Carl, Carrie has to let her precious rivets go and learns the hard way that there is definitely a time for play and a time for work.
11. "Sunk" – When the younger machines accidentally knock a load of oil drums into the dock they are too scared to own up to their mistake. They take Carl's hook to try and retrieve them but-things just get worse as the hook falls into the water as well. Meanwhile, Bozer is worried when he finds all the oil drums missing while Cart searches frantically for his hooky. The young machines have no choice, but to tell Bozer what has happened and Carl successfully lifts all the drums out of the dock, Everyone agrees it's better to own up to an accident straight, just as Bozer reverses into the drums sending the whole lot back into the water again!
12. "Mid-Mileage Crisis" – One day as the younger machines play by the docks, Carl and Lug reflect on their own carefree youth. Lug decides that he's not ready for old age just yet and joins Diggs, Carrie and Scooch for some top gear' fun Carl and Maxine look on aghast while Lug initiates an overly enthusiastic round of Follow My Leader. When things get out of hand - resulting in total chaos - he realises that while it was fun being the young and careless 'Lugster' the older and wiser 'Lug' plays a more vital role on the Construction Site,
13. "One Roll at the Time" – The machines are demolishing a beacon on the end of the jetty. Diggs discovers Bozer is scared of water, much to Bozer's embarrassment. In an effort to help him conquer his fear, Diggs reverses along the jetty, encouraging Bozer to follow him. But Carl accidentally catches the jetty with his hook and it starts to collapse. Bozer manages to overcome his fear in time to rescue Diggs. Afterwards, Bozer finds out all the other machines are all scared of something too and it's really nothing to be embarrassed about after all.

=== Season 4 (2002) ===
1. "Parp Idle!" – Due to a wall of ice that Carl can't even shift, the machines get stuck on a slippery mountain road.
2. "Safe & Sound" – Working in the snowy mountains, Diggs chooses to engage in some dangerous thrills rather than put safety first.
3. "Testing Behaviour" – It's time for the CCT (Construction Certificate Test) and Carrie's convinced she won't pass.
4. "Fog!" – The young machines procrastinate on a job, and pay the price when a thick fog rolls in.
5. "Days of Blunder" – A site scattered with materials inspires Diggs to turn it into an obstacle course, and Scooch wonders if he's up to the challenge.
6. "Star Truck" – When the young machines decide to tell stories, Scooch shows that sometimes the smallest truck has the biggest imagination.
7. "Whodunnit" – The machines are shocked to find that during the night the new multistory parking garage they were building has been destroyed.
8. "If Trucks Could Fly" – When a dare-devil dump truck comes to town, Scooch is thrilled to find out that Lug used to be one himself.
9. "Magno-Carrie" – Carrie doesn't understand how to work her flashy new recharger—so Diggs takes charge, despite the fact he has no idea what he's doing here.
10. "High-Pitched Bozer" – Bozer returns from a servicing only to find that his deep voice has changed and is now high and squeaky.
11. "Carl Wash" – Carl's inventions are legendary... for being a disaster. And when he unveils his new Carl Wash, the young machines are his test dummies.
12. "Don't Panic!" – Bozer goes off site and leaves Carl in charge—which always leads to total chaos. So Maxine steps in to help.
13. "The Call of the Forest" – Despite Bozer's warnings; Diggs plays a prank on Scooch, encouraging him to pursue the mysterious call of the forest.

== Setting ==
The series was set around a large construction site, but later seasons saw the characters in new locations such as a scrapyard, a dock and a mountain. There were no human characters due to the use of Muppet-like vehicles.

== Production ==
=== The models ===
The vehicle models are used by live-action animatronic puppet models. This is the first time The Jim Henson Company have used these, as these types of puppets were restricted to movies like Babe and Labyrinth.
