= Jake T. Forbes =

American editor and author

Jake T. Forbes is an American editor and author who has edited and adapted over 50 Japanese manga and Korean manhwa series for various companies such as Tokyopop, VIZ Media and Go! Comi, including such titles as Fullmetal Alchemist and Fruits Basket.

As a columnist and journalist, Jake T. Forbes covered anime, manga and pop culture for the Los Angeles Times, The Pulse, and Anime Fringe. His debut fiction work is Return to Labyrinth, an authorized sequel to the 1986 Jim Henson film Labyrinth, illustrated by Chris Lie. The series ran for 4 volumes and concluded in 2010.
