= Labyrinth (1986 film) =

1986 film by Jim Henson

- Theatrical release poster by Ted CoConis
- Directed by: Jim Henson
- Screenplay by: Terry Jones
- Story by: Dennis Lee; Jim Henson
- Produced by: Eric Rattray
- Starring: David Bowie; Jennifer Connelly
- Cinematography: Alex Thomson
- Edited by: John Grover
- Music by: Trevor Jones
- Production companies: Henson Associates; Lucasfilm Ltd.
- Distributed by: Tri-Star Pictures (United States); Columbia–EMI–Warner Distributors (United Kingdom)
- Release dates: June 27, 1986 (United States); December 2, 1986 (United Kingdom)
- Running time: 101 minutes
- Countries: United Kingdom; United States
- Language: English
- Budget: $25 million
- Box office: $34 million

Labyrinth is a 1986 musical fantasy film directed by Jim Henson from a screenplay by Terry Jones based on a story conceived by Henson and Dennis Lee. A co-production between Henson Associates and Lucasfilm with George Lucas serving as executive producer, the film stars Jennifer Connelly as teenager Sarah and David Bowie as Jareth, and follows Sarah's journeys through a maze to save her baby brother from the Goblin King.

Labyrinth started as a collaboration between Henson and Brian Froud following their previous collaboration The Dark Crystal (1982). Jones of Monty Python wrote the first draft of the film's script early in 1984, drawing on Froud's sketches for inspiration. The screenplay underwent several revisions by Laura Phillips, Lucas, Lee, and Elaine May—although Jones received the film's sole screenwriting credit. It was shot from April to September 1985 on location in Upper Nyack, Piermont, and Haverstraw, New York, and at Elstree Studios and West Wycombe Park in the United Kingdom. The film's fantastical creatures were designed by Froud and created by Jim Henson's Creature Shop.

The New York Times reported that Labyrinth had a budget of $25 million. The film underperformed at the United States box office, grossing $12.9 million during its US theatrical run. However, it was a success in the United Kingdom and overseas, grossing over $34 million worldwide. Labyrinth was first met with a mixed critical response upon its release, which contributed to a difficult period of Henson's career, according to his son Brian Henson. It was the last feature film that Henson directed, and over the years it has been re-evaluated by many critics. A success on home video and television broadcasts, Labyrinth has gained a large cult following.

The film has been adapted into a variety of media, including books, video games, board games and comics. Tokyopop published a four-volume comic sequel Return to Labyrinth between 2006 and 2010, and Archaia Entertainment published a comic prequel Labyrinth: Coronation between 2018 and 2019. In January 2016, it was announced that a sequel was in development, but by 2024 the project’s future was still uncertain.

== Plot ==
While in the park with her dog, Merlin, 16-year-old Sarah Williams recites from a book titled The Labyrinth but is unable to remember the last line. Realizing that she is late to babysit her infant half-brother Toby, she rushes home and is confronted by her stepmother who goes out with Sarah's father for the night. Frustrated that Toby was given her treasured teddy bear, Lancelot, and annoyed by his constant crying, Sarah rashly wishes that Toby be taken away by the goblins from her book. Toby vanishes and the Goblin King Jareth appears, offering Sarah her dreams in exchange for the baby. She refuses, instantly regretting her wish. Jareth reluctantly gives Sarah 13 hours to solve his labyrinth and find Toby before he is turned into a goblin forever.

Jareth transports Sarah to a wasteland where she meets a dwarf named Hoggle who aids her in entering the labyrinth. As Sarah traverses the labyrinth, Jareth plays carelessly with Toby in his castle at the labyrinth's center. After falling down a trapdoor, Sarah ends up in an oubliette where she reunites with Hoggle. The two are confronted by Jareth, escape one of his traps, and encounter a troll named Ludo being tormented by goblins. Hoggle flees, while Sarah befriends Ludo after freeing him but loses him in a forest.

Hoggle encounters Jareth, who orders him to give an enchanted peach to Sarah, calling his loyalty into question, as he was supposed to take her back to the beginning of the labyrinth. Sarah is harassed by a group of creatures called The Fire Gang, but Hoggle comes to her aid. She kisses him, and they fall through a trapdoor that deposits them in a flatulent swamp called the "Bog of Eternal Stench" where they reunite with Ludo. The trio meet the guard of the swamp, the anthropomorphic Fox Terrier Sir Didymus and his Old English Sheepdog "steed" Ambrosius. Sarah begins crossing a bridge over the bog, but it collapses, and Ludo summons a trail of rocks to save her. Sir Didymus joins the group as they leave the bog.

Hoggle gives a hungry Sarah the enchanted peach and runs away as she falls into a trance and forgets her quest. She dreams of a masquerade ball and sees Jareth in the crowd. She approaches him, and the two dance together, but Sarah is reminded of her quest when she sees a clock. She runs, escaping the trance and falling into a junkyard outside the Goblin City near Jareth's castle. An old Junk Lady fails to trick Sarah, who regains her memory and rejoins Ludo and Sir Didymus. They are confronted by the humongous, robotic gate guard, but Hoggle comes to their rescue.

Despite Hoggle feeling unworthy of forgiveness for his betrayal, Sarah and the others welcome him back, and together they enter the city. Jareth is alerted to the group's presence and sends his goblin army to stop them. Ludo summons a multitude of rocks to chase the goblins away, and they enter the castle. With the 13 hours nearly elapsed, Sarah insists she must face Jareth alone and promises to call the others if needed.

In a room modeled after M. C. Escher's Relativity, she confronts Jareth while trying to retrieve Toby. She recites the lines from her book that mirror her adventure up to that point, but she still cannot remember the last line. Jareth offers Sarah her dreams again, but she remembers the final line: "You have no power over me!" Defeated at the last second, Jareth transforms into a barn owl and flies away, returning Toby to Sarah in honor of his terms.

Realizing how important Toby is to her, Sarah gives him Lancelot and retires to her room as her father and stepmother return home. She sees her friends in the mirror and admits that, even though she has grown up, she still needs them in her life, whereupon the labyrinth characters appear in her room for a raucous reunion party, hugging each other in joy. Jareth, in his barn owl form, watches their celebration from outside and then flies off into the moonlight.

== Cast ==
- David Bowie as Jareth, the king of the goblins
- Jennifer Connelly as Sarah Williams, a 16-year-old girl who searches through the labyrinth to find her baby brother Toby
- Toby Froud as Toby Williams, Sarah's baby half-brother
- Shelley Thompson as Irene Williams, Toby's mother and Sarah's stepmother
- Christopher Malcolm as Robert Williams, Sarah and Toby's father

Juggler Michael Moschen is credited with performing Jareth's elaborate "crystal-ball manipulation", which Moschen had created for his stage performances and is now known as contact juggling. He performed the manipulations blind, behind Bowie's back.

=== Creature performers ===
Character	Puppeteer	Voice
Hoggle	Brian Henson	Brian Henson
Hoggle	Shari Weiser (in body suit)	
Ludo	Ron Mueck	Ron Mueck
Ludo	with Rob Mills	
Sir Didymus	Dave Goelz with David Barclay	David Shaughnessy
The Worm	Karen Prell	Timothy Bateson
The Wiseman	Frank Oz	Michael Hordern
The Hat	Dave Goelz	David Shaughnessy
The Junk Lady	Karen Prell	Denise Bryer
The Four Guards	Steve Whitmire, Kevin Clash, Anthony Asbury, Dave Goelz	Anthony Jackson, Douglas Blackwell, David Shaughnessy, Timothy Bateson
Right Door Knocker	Anthony Asbury	David Healy
Left Door Knocker	Dave Goelz	Robert Beatty
Fiery #1	Kevin Clash	Kevin Clash
Fiery #1	with David Barclay & Toby Philpott	
Fiery #2	Karen Prell with Ron Mueck & Ian Thom	Charles Augins
Fiery #3	Dave Goelz with Rob Mills & Sherry Ammott	Danny John-Jules
Fiery #4	Steve Whitmire with Cheryl Henson & Kevin Bradshaw	Danny John-Jules
Fiery #5	Anthony Asbury with Alistair Fullarton & Rollin Krewson	Richard Bodkin
Ambrosius	Steve Whitmire, Kevin Clash	Percy Edwards
Goblins	Don Austen, Michael Bayliss, Martin Bridle, Fiona Beynor Brown, Simon Buckley, David Bulbeck, Sue Dacre, Geoff Felix, Trevor Freeborn, Christine Glanville, David Greenaway, Brian James, Jan King, Ronnie Le Drew, Terry Lee, Christopher Leith, Kathryn Mullen, Angie Passmore, Michael Petersen, Nigel Plaskitt, Judy Preece, Michael Quinn, Gillie Robic, David Rudman, David Showler, Robin Stevens, Ian Tregonning, Mary Turner, Robert Tygner, Mak Wilson, Francis Wright	Michael Attwell, Sean Barrett, Timothy Bateson, Douglas Blackwell, John Bluthal, Brian Henson, Anthony Jackson, Peter Marinker, Ron Mueck, Steve Nallon, Jan Ravens, Enn Reitel, Kerry Shale, David Shaughnessy

Goblin Corps performed by Marc Antona, Kenny Baker, Michael Henbury Ballan, Danny Blackner, Peter Burroughs, Toby Clark, Tessa Crockett, Warwick Davis, Malcolm Dixon, Anthony Georghiou, Paul Grant, Andrew Herd, Richard Jones, John Key, Mark Lisle, Peter Mandell, Jack Purvis, Katie Purvis, Nicholas Read, Linda Spriggs, Penny Stead, and Albert Wilkinson.

== Influences ==
I think what we are trying to do with this film is kind of harken back to a lot of those classic fantasy adventures that a young girl goes into: The Wizard of Oz, Alice in Wonderland, and the works of Maurice Sendak. I don't mind comparisons. It's not like we are trying to outdo them. We are simply related; The Wizard of Oz and Alice in Wonderland are so much a part of us. This is the fantasy world that she (the Labyrinth heroine) has grown up with. These are the stories that have fascinated her.

— Jim Henson on comparisons of Labyrinth to other works.

Richard Corliss noted that the film appeared to have been influenced by The Wizard of Oz and the works of Maurice Sendak, writing that, "Labyrinth lures a modern Dorothy Gale out of the drab Kansas of real life into a land where the wild things are". Nina Darnton of The New York Times wrote that the plot of Labyrinth "is very similar to Outside Over There by Mr. Sendak, in which 9-year-old Ida's baby sister is stolen by the goblins". This almost got the film into legal trouble, as the similarity caused Sendak's lawyers to advise Jim Henson to stop production on the film. However, the legal complaint was eventually settled, with an end credit being added that states that "Jim Henson acknowledges his debt to the works of Maurice Sendak". Sendak's Outside Over There and Where the Wild Things Are are shown briefly in Sarah's room at the start of the film, along with copies of Alice in Wonderland, The Wizard of Oz, and Grimms' Fairy Tales.

The film's concept designer Brian Froud, who had previously collaborated with Henson on The Dark Crystal, has stated that the character of Jareth was influenced by a diverse range of literary sources. In his afterword to the 20th anniversary edition of The Goblins of Labyrinth, Froud wrote that Jareth references "the romantic figures of Heathcliff in Wuthering Heights and a brooding Rochester from Jane Eyre" and The Scarlet Pimpernel. Bowie's costumes were intentionally eclectic, drawing on the image of Marlon Brando's leather jacket from The Wild One as well as that of a knight "with the worms of death eating through his armor" from Grimms' Fairy Tales. In his audio commentary of Labyrinth, Froud said that Jareth also has influences from Kabuki theatre.

The dialogue starting with the phrase "you remind me of the babe" that occurs between Jareth and the goblins in the Magic Dance sequence in the film is a direct reference to an exchange between Cary Grant and Shirley Temple in the 1947 film The Bachelor and the Bobby-Soxer.

Labyrinth's "Escher scene" features an elaborate staircase set inspired by the art of Dutch artist M. C. Escher. A print of Escher's lithograph Relativity is shown on Sarah's bedroom wall in the film.

== Production ==
=== Origins and script ===
Brian Froud says that Labyrinth was first discussed between himself and director Jim Henson. Both agreed to work on another project together, and Froud suggested that the film should feature goblins. On the same journey, Froud "pictured a baby surrounded by goblins" and this strong visual image, along with Froud's insight that goblins traditionally steal babies, provided the basis for the film's plot.

Henson discussed the film's origins to say that he and Froud "wanted to do a lighter weight picture, with more of a sense of comedy since The Dark Crystal got kind of heavy, heavier than we had intended. Now, I wanted to do a film with the characters having more personality and interacting more".

Labyrinth was being seriously discussed as early as March 1983, when Henson held a meeting with Froud and children's author Dennis Lee. Lee was tasked with writing a novella on which a script could be based, submitting it at the end of 1983. Henson approached Terry Jones to write the film's script, as "his daughter Lisa had just read Erik the Viking and suggested that he try me as screenwriter". Jones was given Dennis Lee's novella to use as a basis for his script but later told Empire that Lee had produced an unfinished "poetic novella" that he "didn't really get on with". In light of this, Jones "discarded it and sat down with Brian [Froud]'s drawings and sifted through them and found the ones that I really liked, and started creating the story from them".

Jones is credited with writing the screenplay, while the shooting script was actually a collaborative effort that featured contributions from Henson, George Lucas, Laura Phillips, and Elaine May. Jones has said that the finished film differs greatly from his original vision. Jones states that, "I didn't feel that it was very much mine. I always felt it fell between two stories, Jim wanted it to be one thing and I wanted it to be about something else." Jones has said that his version of the script was "about the world, and about people who are more interested in manipulating the world than actually baring themselves at all". In Jones' original script, Jareth merely seems "all powerful to begin with" and is actually using the Labyrinth to "keep people from getting to his heart".

Jones has said that Bowie's involvement in the project had a significant impact on the direction taken with the film. Jones had originally intended for the audience not to see the centre of the Labyrinth, prior to Sarah's reaching it, as he felt that, in doing so, it robbed the film of a significant "hook". Henson decided that he wanted Jareth to sing and appear throughout the film, which was something Jones considered the "wrong" decision, with the thought of Bowie starring in the film in mind. Despite his misgivings, Jones rewrote the script to allow for performing songs throughout the film. This draft of the script "went away for about a year". During this time, it was redrafted first by Phillips and subsequently by Lucas.

An early draft of the script attributed to Jones and Phillips is markedly different from the finished film. The early script has Jareth enter Sarah's house in the guise of Robin Zakar, the author of a play she is due to perform in. Sarah does not wish her brother would be taken away by the goblins, and Jareth snatches him away against her will. Jareth is overtly villainous in this draft of the script. His final confrontation with Sarah tells her that he would "much rather have a Queen" than "a little goblin prince". The early script ends with Sarah kicking Jareth in disgust, and her blows transform him into a powerless, sniveling goblin. In the extensive junkyard scene, Jareth operates the Junk Lady as a puppet, whereas, in the film, she is autonomous. There is actually a pub or bar in the Labyrinth where the Man with Hat and Hoggle gather, and the river Lethe in Greek myth is mentioned. As well as this, the ballroom scene features extensive dialogue between Jareth and Sarah, whereas, in the film, there is none (though there is in the novelization by A. C. H. Smith), and the goings-on with the dancers in the ballroom are more overtly sexualised.

The redrafted script was sent to Bowie, who found that it lacked humour and considered withdrawing his involvement in the project as a result. To ensure Bowie's involvement, Henson asked Jones to "do a bit more" to the script to make it more humorous. May met with Henson in several months, prior to the start of filming in April 1985, and was asked to polish the script. May's changes "humanised the characters" and pleased Henson to the extent that they were incorporated into the film's shooting script.

At least 25 treatments and scripts were drafted for Labyrinth between 1983 and 1985. The film's shooting script was only ready shortly before filming began.

=== Casting ===
Henson intended the protagonist of the film, at different stages of its development, as a king whose baby had been put under an enchantment, a princess from a fantasy world, and a young girl from Victorian England. They made the lead a teenage girl from contemporary America to make the film more commercial. Henson noted that he wished to "make the idea of taking responsibility for one's life, which is one of the neat realisations a teenager experiences, a central thought of the film".

Auditions for the lead role of Sarah began in England in April 1984. Helena Bonham Carter auditioned for the role but was passed over in favour of an American actress. Monthly auditions were held in the United States until January 1985, and Jane Krakowski, Yasmine Bleeth, Sarah Jessica Parker, Marisa Tomei, Laura Dern, Claudia Wells, Ally Sheedy, Maddie Corman, and Mia Sara all auditioned for the role. Out of these, Krakowski, Sheedy, and Corman were considered the top candidates. Fourteen-year-old actress Jennifer Connelly "won Jim [Henson] over", and he cast her within a week. Henson states that Connelly was chosen, as she "could act that kind of dawn-twilight time between childhood and womanhood". Connelly moved to England in February 1985, in advance of the film's rehearsals, which began in March. Connelly discussed her understanding of her role with Elle magazine that the film is about "a young girl growing out of her childhood, who is just now becoming aware of the responsibilities that come with growing up".

The character of Jareth also underwent some significant developments during the early stages of preproduction. Henson states that he originally intended him as another puppet creature in the same vein as his goblin subjects. Henson decided that the role should be filled by a live actor and initially considered offering it to Simon MacCorkindale or Kevin Kline. Henson eventually wanted a big, charismatic star "who could change the film's whole musical style" to play the Goblin King and sought a contemporary musician for the role, considering Sting, Prince, Mick Jagger, and Michael Jackson before choosing Bowie.

Henson stated that, "I wanted to put two characters of flesh and bone in the middle of all these artificial creatures, and David Bowie embodies a certain maturity, with his sexuality, his disturbing aspect, all sorts of things that characterise the adult world." Henson met David Bowie in the summer of 1983 to seek his involvement, as Bowie was in the United States for his Serious Moonlight Tour at the time. Henson pursued Bowie for the role of Jareth and sent him each revised draft of the film's script for his comments. During a meeting that took place on June 18, 1984, Henson showed Bowie The Dark Crystal and a selection of Brian Froud's concept drawings to pique his interest in the project. Bowie formally agreed to take part on February 15, 1985, several months before filming began. Bowie discussed why he was involved in the film, stating that, "I'd always wanted to be involved in the music-writing aspect of a movie that would appeal to children of all ages, as well as everyone else, and I must say that Jim gave me a completely free hand with it. The script itself was terribly amusing without being vicious or spiteful or bloody, and it had a lot more heart in it than many other special effects movies, so I was pretty hooked from the beginning."

Gates McFadden was originally offered the role of Sarah's mother by Henson, and she signed up to do the choreography as well, but she was not allowed to act in the film and had to accept the choreography role alone due to union rules. She is credited in the film as Cheryl McFadden (her first name), as she usually is when being credited for choreography work. She said that, "Even though that was the reason I took the job and had, for two years, been thinking that was what was going to happen. They would not allow us."

=== Filming ===
The team that worked on Labyrinth was largely assembled from talent who had been involved in various other projects with The Jim Henson Company. Veteran performers Dave Goelz and Steve Whitmire operated various puppets in the film, along with Karen Prell, Ron Mueck, Rob Mills, and Kathryn Mullen (as various goblins), who had all worked with Henson on Fraggle Rock. Kevin Clash, a puppeteer from Sesame Street best known for performing the character Elmo, also worked on the film as various creatures, as did Frank Oz, who performed briefly as the Wiseman (while also directing Little Shop of Horrors around that time). Members of Henson's family also worked on the production, including son Brian (the voice and chief puppeteer for Hoggle) and daughter Cheryl (who assisted on one of the Fireys and is also credited for building the characters). Newcomers working on the production included puppeteers Anthony Asbury, Angie Passmore, Nigel Plaskitt, and Mak Wilson (the latter three of whom are credited for performing goblins) who had previously worked on the satirical puppet show Spitting Image, while a few others, including David Barclay, David Greenaway, Toby Philpott, and Mike Quinn, were carried over from The Dark Crystal. Other goblin puppeteers included David Rudman (also known for his work on Sesame Street), Robin Stevens, Don Austen, Robert Tygner, and, briefly, Jim Henson himself. Louise Gold, a veteran Muppet performer who had gotten her start on The Muppet Show, cameos in the film as a masked ballroom dancer during the "As the World Falls Down" sequence, while Kenny Baker and Warwick Davis, best known as the performers of Star Wars' R2-D2 and Wicket W. Warrick respectively, were credited as some of the "Goblin Corps". "Ambrosius", Sir Didymus' canine steed, was voiced by Percy Edwards, who had previously supplied the voice of Fizzgig in The Dark Crystal. Ronnie Le Drew, best known for playing Zippy on the ITV Children's Programme Rainbow also worked on the film.

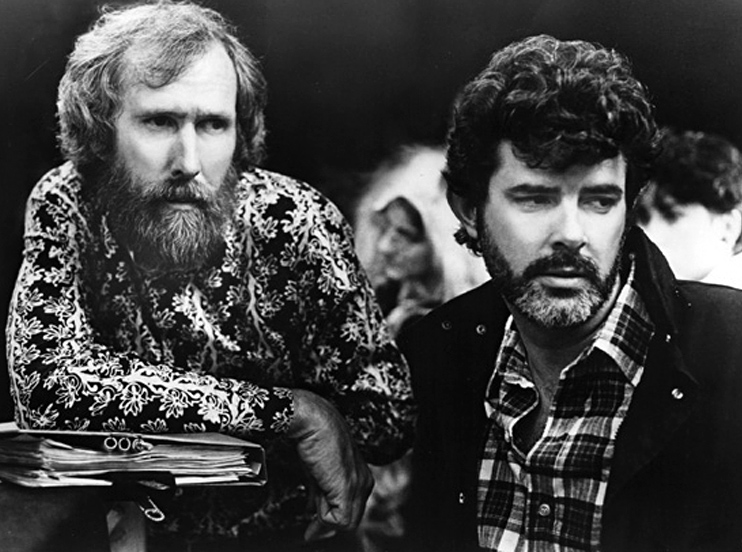
Director Jim Henson and executive producer George Lucas on set during filming

Principal photography began on April 15, 1985, at Elstree Studios. Labyrinth took five months to film and was a complicated shoot due to the various puppets and animatronic creatures involved. In the making-of documentary Inside the Labyrinth, Henson stated that Jim Henson's Creature Shop had been building the puppets and characters required for around a year and a half, prior to shooting, but "everything came together in the last couple weeks". Henson noted that, "even if you have the characters together, the puppeteers start working with them, they find problems or they try to figure out what they're going to do with these characters".

Each of the film's key puppets required a small team of puppeteers to operate it, but Hoggle was the most complex puppet of the production. Shari Weiser was inside the costume, while Hoggle's face was radio-controlled by Brian Henson (who also provided the character's voice and performed a few goblins) and three additional puppeteers. Brian Henson stated that Weiser "does all the body movement and her head is inside the head. However, the jaw is not connected to her jaw. Nothing that the face is doing has any connection with what she's doing with her face. The other four members of the crew are all radio crew, myself included," in the Inside the Labyrinth documentary. Brian Henson also said of the challenges involved with performing Hoggle that, "five performers trying to get one character out of one puppet was a very tough thing. Basically, what it takes is a lot of rehearsing and getting to know each other." The film's big, ogre-like monster Ludo, whose original build weighed over 100 pounds (45 kg), was similarly challenging. It would have been too exhausting for performer Ron Mueck to inhabit the 75 pounds (34 kg) suit for all of his scenes, so Henson decided to have Mueck and Rob Mills exchange performances inside Ludo, as they were the same size and had a similar body shape.

At the early stages of filming, stars Connelly and Bowie found it difficult to interact naturally with the puppets they shared most of their scenes with. Bowie said that, "I had some initial problems working with Hoggle and the rest, because, for one thing, what they say doesn't come from their mouths, but from the side of the set or from behind you." Connelly remarked that, "it was a bit strange [working almost exclusively with puppets in the film], but I think both Dave [Bowie] and I got over that and just took it as a challenge to work with these puppets, and, by the end of the film, it wasn't a challenge anymore. They were there, and they were their characters."

The film required large and ambitious sets constructed, from the Shaft of Hands to the rambling, distorted Goblin City where the film's climactic battle takes place. The Shaft of Hands sequence was filmed on a rig that was 30 feet (9.1 m) high, with a camera mounted on a forty-foot vertical camera track. Many grey, scaly hands integral to the scene were actually 150 live hands supplied by 75 performers and 200 foam-rubber hands. Connelly was strapped into a harness when shooting the scene and spent time between takes suspended midway up the shaft.

The set of the Goblin City was built on Stage 6 at Elstree Studios near London and required the largest panoramic back cloth ever made. Production designer Elliot Scott states that the biggest challenge he faced was building the forest Sarah and her party pass through on their way to Jareth's Castle. The film's production notes state that, "the entire forest required 120 truckloads of tree branches, 1,200 turfs of grass, 850 pounds (390 kg) of dried leaves, 133 bags of lichen, and 35 bundles of mossy old man's beard".

Most filming was conducted at Elstree Studios, while a small amount of location shooting was carried out in England and the US. The park seen at the start of the film is part of the West Wycombe Park estate in Buckinghamshire, England. The scenes of Sarah running back home were filmed in various towns in New York State, namely Upper Nyack, Piermont, and Haverstraw.

Shooting wrapped on September 8, 1985.

=== Post-production ===
Most of the visual effects on Labyrinth were achieved in-camera with several notable exceptions. The most prominent of these post-production effects was the computer-generated owl that appears at the opening of the film. The sequence was created by animators Larry Yaeger and Bill Kroyer at Digital Productions and marked the first use of a realistic CGI animal in a film. The owl head maquette was rescued from a skip when the animation company Omnibus went bankrupt in 1987.

The scene where Sarah encounters the Fire Gang was altered in post-production, as it had been filmed against black velvet cloth to disguise the puppeteers, and a new forest background was added behind. Jim Henson was unhappy with the compositing of the finished scene, although he considered the puppetry featured in it worthy including them.

Henson received help editing the film from executive producer George Lucas. Henson states that, "When we hit the editing, I did the first cut, and then George was heavily involved on bringing it to the final cut. After that, I took it over again and did the next few months of post-production and audio." Henson went on to say that, "When you edit a film with somebody else you have to compromise. I always want to go one way, and George goes another way, but we each took turns trading off, giving and taking. George tends to be very action-oriented and he cuts dialogue quite tight. I tend to cut looser, and go for more lyrical pauses, which can slow the story. [In doing] so, I loosen up his tightness, and he tightens my looseness."

=== Music ===
The soundtrack album features Trevor Jones' score, which is split into six tracks for the soundtrack: "Into the Labyrinth", "Sarah", "Hallucination", "The Goblin Battle", "Thirteen O'Clock", and "Home at Last".

Bowie wrote and recorded five songs for the film: "Underground", "Magic Dance", "Chilly Down", "As the World Falls Down", and "Within You". In the process, he also wrote lyrics for two songs, "All in All" and "Crystal Heartbeat", which did not feature in the final film or soundtrack. "Underground" is featured on the soundtrack twice. The first version of "Underground" is played in an edited version that was played over the film's opening sequence, while the second version is played full. "Underground" was released in various territories as a single and, in certain markets, was also released in an instrumental version and an extended dance mix. "Magic Dance" was released as a 12" single in the US. "As the World Falls Down" was initially slated for release as a follow-up single to "Underground" at Christmas in 1986, but this plan did not materialise. Bowie did not perform the lead vocals on "Chilly Down", which was performed by Charles Augins, Richard Bodkin, Kevin Clash, and Danny John-Jules, the actors who voiced the "Firey" creatures in the film. A demo of "Chilly Down" under its original title "Wild Things", which was performed by Bowie, was leaked in 2016 by Danny John-Jules shortly after Bowie's death.

Steve Barron produced promotional music videos for "Underground" and "As the World Falls Down". The music video for "Underground" features Bowie as a nightclub singer who stumbles upon the Labyrinth encountering many of the creatures seen in the film. The clip for "As the World Falls Down" integrates clips from the film. This video uses them, along with black and white shots of Bowie performing the song in an elegant room. Both were released on the 1993 VHS tape Bowie – The Video Collection and the 2002 two-disc DVD set Best of Bowie.

In 2017, Capitol Studios announced a reissue of the soundtrack on a vinyl record. This included all five original songs by David Bowie, along with Trevor Jones' score.

== Release ==
=== Promotion ===
The production of Labyrinth was covered in multiple high-profile magazines and newspapers, in anticipation of its release, with articles appearing in The New York Times, Time, and Starlog magazines. An article that appeared in The New York Times shortly after filming wrapped in September 1985 focused heavily on the film's large scale and emphasised the size of the production and selling Labyrinth as a more "accessible" film than The Dark Crystal due to the casting of live actors in its key roles. An hour-long making-of documentary that covered the filming of Labyrinth and included interviews with the key figures involved in its production was broadcast on television as Inside the Labyrinth.

Labyrinth was featured in music trade papers such as Billboard magazine due to Bowie's soundtrack for the film. Bowie was not heavily involved in promoting the film, but Jim Henson was nonetheless grateful that he produced a music video to accompany the song "Underground" from the soundtrack, saying that, "I think it's the best thing he could have done for the film." Commercial artist Steven Chorney provided the film's teaser one-sheet, while Ted Coconis produced a one-sheet poster for the film's North American release.

A range of merchandise was produced to accompany the film's release, including plush toys of Sir Didymus and Ludo, a board game, a computer game, and multiple jigsaw puzzles. An exhibition of the film's characters and sets toured across shopping malls in various cities in the United States, including New York City, Dallas, and Chicago. Labyrinth was featured in an exhibition titled "Jim Henson's Magic World" that was shown at the Seibu Department Store in Tokyo in August 1986.

=== Theatrical release ===
Labyrinth opened in US theaters on June 27, 1986. The film received a Royal Charity premiere at the London Film Festival on December 1, 1986, with Charles, Prince of Wales and Diana, Princess of Wales in attendance. Jim Henson, Brian Henson, Brian Froud, Jennifer Connelly, and the animatronic creature Ludo were all present to support the film.

The film was rolled out in other European countries largely between December 1986 and February 1987 and premiered in France as Labyrinthe on December 2 and in West Germany as Die Reise ins Labyrinth (The Journey into the Labyrinth) on December 13. The film was released in Denmark as Labyrinten til troldkongens slot (The Labyrinth to the Troll King's Castle) on February 20, 1987, and saw its last theatrical release in Hungary under the title Fantasztikus labirintus (Fantastic Labyrinth) when it premiered there on July 7, 1988. The film was also released in Brazil on December 25, 1986, where it was named Labirinto – A Magia do Tempo (Labyrinth – The Magic of Time).

In April 2012, a remastered re-release of the film was screened at the Astor Theatre in Melbourne, Australia. In celebration of the film's 40th anniversary, Labyrinth is scheduled to return to theaters from January 8 to January 15 in 2026.

=== Home media ===
Labyrinth was first released on VHS, Betamax, and pan and scan LaserDisc in 1987 by Embassy Home Entertainment in the United States and by Channel 5 Video Distribution in the United Kingdom. After Embassy was sold to Coca-Cola in 1985, its home video line was renamed Nelson Entertainment, and a VHS release was also made under this label (re-using the same Embassy box artwork). New Line Home Video re-released the film on LaserDisc in Widescreen through Image Entertainment in 1994. Columbia TriStar Home Video reissued the film on VHS for the last time in 1999 in the United States and in the United Kingdom the same year, with Inside the Labyrinth included as a special feature.

The film made its DVD premiere in 1999 in the United States and has since been re-released on DVD in 2003, 2007, and 2016. All DVD releases of the film feature the Inside the Labyrinth documentary as an extra. The 2003 re-release was described as a collector's edition and featured a set of exclusive collectors cards that featured concept art by Brian Froud. The 2007 release was promoted as an Anniversary Edition and featured a commentary by Brian Froud and two newly produced making-of documentaries, "Journey Through the Labyrinth: Kingdom of Characters" and "Journey Through the Labyrinth: The Quest for Goblin City", which featured interviews with producer George Lucas, choreographer Gates McFadden of Star Trek fame (listed as Cheryl McFadden) and Brian Henson.

The film was released on Blu-ray in a 2009 package, which replicated the extras featured on the 2007 Anniversary Edition DVD. The Blu-ray release featured one new special feature, a picture-in-picture track that lasts the length of the film, and interviews with the crew and several minor cast members including Warwick Davis.

A 30th anniversary edition of Labyrinth was released on DVD, Blu-ray, and 4K Blu-ray in 2016. An Amazon exclusive gift set version came with packaging similar to Jareth's Escher-style stairs. New features included "The Henson Legacy" featuring Jennifer Connelly and members of the Henson family discussing Jim Henson's puppetry style and includes a visit to the Center for Puppetry Arts, which houses many of Jim Henson's puppets. Adam Savage from MythBusters hosts a Q&A with Brian Henson, David Goelz, Karen Prell, and Sheri Weiser. Jennifer Connelly, Brian Henson, and Cheryl Henson pay tribute to David Bowie in "The Goblin King".

In 2021, a 35th anniversary limited edition of Labyrinth was released on Blu-ray and 4K Blu-ray as a set in a digibook designed to resemble Sarah's book from the film. The 2021 Blu-ray disc is the same as the 2016 release, while the 2021 4K Blu-ray disc includes an upgraded 4K transfer with Dolby Vision HDR, and special features such as 25 minutes of deleted and extended scenes with optional commentary by Brian Henson and 55 minutes of footage from the original auditions for the role of Sarah.

On January 1, 2024, a worldwide distribution agreement signed between Shout! Studios and the Jim Henson Company for Labyrinth and The Dark Crystal as well as associated content went into effect. The agreement grants Shout! Studios streaming, video-on-demand, broadcast, digital download, packaged media and limited non-theatrical rights to the films. The company released the films on all major digital entertainment platforms on February 6, 2024.

== Reception ==
=== Box office ===
Labyrinth opened at number eight at the US box office with $3,549,243 from 1,141 theaters, which placed it behind The Karate Kid Part II, Back to School, Legal Eagles, Ruthless People, Running Scared, Top Gun, and Ferris Bueller's Day Off. In its next weekend at the box office, the film dropped to number 13 in the charts, only earning $1,836,177. By the end of its run in US cinemas, the film had grossed $12,729,917, just over half of its $25 million budget.

The film grossed $9 million in Japan during the summer. In December, the film opened in Europe, opening at number one at the UK box office. It was the highest-grossing film over the Christmas period in the UK, with a gross of $4.5 million in its first month, three times more than its competitors. It was also the highest-grossing film for the period in Spain, Bolivia, and Venezuela. By January 1987, it had grossed $7.5 million altogether from Australia, Brazil, Central America, Germany, Holland, Italy, Mexico, and Spain, for a worldwide gross of over $34 million at that time.

=== Critical response ===
As he did with less success in The Dark Crystal, Mr. Henson uses the art of puppetry to create visual effects that until very recently were possible to attain only with animation. The result is really quite startling. It removes storyboard creations from the flat celluloid cartoon image and makes them three-dimensional, so that they actually come alive and interact with living people. The technique makes animation seem dull and old-fashioned by comparison.

— Nina Darnton of The New York Times on Labyrinth's technical achievements.

Labyrinth received mixed to positive reviews from critics. On the review aggregator website Rotten Tomatoes, the film holds an approval rating of 63% based on 128 reviews, with an average rating of 6.5/10. The website's critics consensus reads, "While it's arguably more interesting on a visual level, Labyrinth provides further proof of director Jim Henson's boundless imagination." Metacritic, which uses a weighted average, assigned the film a score of 50 out of 100, based on 10 critics, indicating "mixed or average" reviews. Audiences polled by CinemaScore gave the film an average grade of "B" on an A+ to F scale.

Roger Ebert acknowledged that Labyrinth was made with "infinite care and pains", and he gave the film two stars out of four, as he felt that the film "never really comes alive." Ebert said that, as the film was set in an "arbitrary world", none of the events in it had any consequences, robbing the film of any dramatic tension. Gene Siskel's review of Labyrinth for the Chicago Tribune was highly negative, and he referred to it as an "awful" film with a "pathetic story", "much too complicated plot", and "visually ugly style." Siskel objected to the film's "violent" plot, writing that, "the sight of a baby in peril is one of sleaziest gimmicks a film can employ to gain our attention, but Henson does it."

Other critics were more positive. Kathryn Buxton of The Palm Beach Post found that it had "excitement and thrills enough for audiences of all ages, as well as a fun and sometimes slightly naughty sense of humor." Roger Hurlburt of the Sun-Sentinel called Labyrinth "a fantasy fan's gourmet delight", writing that "though plot aspects are obviously borrowed from other fantasy stories – Cinderella, Snow White and the fairy tale classics, events are served in unique form." Bruce Bailey of The Montreal Gazette admired the film's script, stating that, "Terry Jones has drawn on his dry wit and bizarre imagination and come up with a script that transforms these essentially familiar elements and plot structures into something that fairly throbs with new life." Bailey was also impressed by the film's depth, writing that, "adults will have the additional advantage of appreciating the story as a coming-of-age parable."

Several critics noted the film's subtext and found it successful to varying degrees. Saw Tek Meng of the New Straits Times acknowledged that "Sarah's experiences in the labyrinth are symbolic of her transition from child to woman" but ultimately found the film "too linear" for its latent themes to come through. The New York Times' Nina Darnton compared the film's tone to the writings of E. T. A. Hoffmann, stating that Hoffman's The Nutcracker "is also about the voyage to womanhood, including the hint of sexual awakening, which Sarah experiences too in the presence of a goblin king." Darnton enjoyed the film and considered it more successful than Henson's previous collaboration with Brian Froud, The Dark Crystal.

Colin Greenland reviewed Labyrinth for White Dwarf #85, stating that, "Like Time Bandits, Labyrinth is the story of a child trying to negotiate a dreamlike otherworld where logic is not all that it should be, and so it also borrows lavishly from The Princess and the Goblin, Alice in Wonderland, The Wizard of Oz, and Where the Wild Things Are. A couple of scenes along the quest are truly eerie. Others are doggedly sentimental." Lynn Minton in Parade opined that "what [Labyrinth] lacks in story and memorable music it makes up for, in part, with amusing special effects, loveable and funny "people" and an emotionally satisfying ending."

Connelly's portrayal of Sarah polarised critics and received strong criticism from some reviewers. Los Angeles Daily News critic Kirk Honeycutt referred to Connelly as "a bland and minimally talented young actress." Jon Marlowe wrote for The Miami News, stating that, "Connelly is simply the wrong person for the right job. She has a squeaky voice that begins to grate on you; when she cries, you can see the onions in her eyes." Hal Lipper of the St. Petersburg Times felt contrary to these negative views and praised her acting, saying that, "Connelly makes the entire experience seem real. She acts so naturally around the puppets that you begin to believe in their life-like qualities."

Bowie's performance was variously lauded and derided. In his largely positive review of the film for Time, Richard Corliss praised him as "charismatic" referring to his character as a "Kabuki sorcerer who offers his ravishing young antagonist the gilded perks of adult servitude." Bruce Bailey enjoyed Bowie's performance, writing that, "the casting of Bowie can't be faulted on any count. He has just the right look for a creature who's the object of both loathing and secret desire." In a largely critical review, Hal Lipper found that, "Bowie forgoes acting, preferring to prance around his lair while staring solemnly into the camera. He's not exactly wooden. Plastic might be a more accurate description."

Henson came "the closest I've seen him to turning in on himself and getting quite depressed" following the film's mixed reception, his son Brian told Life magazine. It was the last feature film directed by Henson before his death in 1990.

Labyrinth has been re-evaluated by several notable publications after Henson's death. A review from 2000 in Empire magazine called the film "a fabulous fantasy" and wrote that, "David Bowie cuts a spooky enough figure in that fright wig to fit right in with this extraordinary menagerie of Goth Muppets. And Jennifer Connelly, still in the flush of youth, makes for an appealingly together kind of heroine." Michael Wilmington described Labyrinth as "dazzling", writing that it is "a real masterpiece of puppetry and special effects, an absolutely gorgeous children's fantasy movie", for the Chicago Tribune in 2007. In 2010, Total Film ran a feature called "Why We Love Labyrinth", which described Labyrinth as a "hyper-real, vibrant daydream, Labyrinth's main strength lies in its fairytale roots which give the fantastical story a platform from which to launch into some deliriously outlandish scenarios." In their February 2012 issue, Empire featured a four-page spread on Labyrinth as part of their Muppet Special.

=== Accolades ===
Labyrinth was nominated at the British Academy Film Awards for Best Special Visual Effects and received two Saturn Award nominations for Best Fantasy Film and Best Costumes. The film was also nominated for the Hugo Award for Best Dramatic Presentation.

In 2008, the American Film Institute nominated Labyrinth for inclusion on its Top 10 Fantasy Films list. Labyrinth is ranked 72nd on Empire's "The 80 best '80s movies" and 26th on Time Out's "The 50 best fantasy movies". In 2019, The Daily Telegraph named it as one of "The 77 best kids' films of all time".

=== Legacy ===
Despite its poor performance at the American box office, Labyrinth was a success on home video and later on DVD. David Bowie told an interviewer in 1992 that, "every Christmas a new flock of children comes up to me and says, 'Oh! you're the one who's in Labyrinth!'" In 1997, Jennifer Connelly said that, "I still get recognized for Labyrinth by little girls in the weirdest places. I can't believe they still recognize me from that movie. It's on TV all the time and I guess I pretty much look the same."

Labyrinth has become a cult film. Brian Henson remembered his father Jim Henson as being aware that Labyrinth and The Dark Crystal both had cult followings by the time of his death in 1990, saying that "he was able to see all that and know that it was appreciated". Academic Andrea Wright wrote that Labyrinth has managed to maintain audience popularity long after its initial release to a greater extent than The Dark Crystal. Since 1997, an annual two-day event called the "Labyrinth of Jareth Masquerade Ball", in which revelers attend dressed in costumes inspired by the film, has been held in various locations, including San Diego, Hollywood, and Los Angeles. Labyrinth has developed a significant internet fan following since the early 1990s, and, as of 2021, FanFiction.Net hosts more than 10,000 stories in its Labyrinth section.

The strong DVD sales of Labyrinth prompted rights-holders the Jim Henson Company and Sony Pictures to look into making a sequel, and Curse of the Goblin King was briefly used as a placeholder title. However, the decision was ultimately taken to avoid making a direct sequel and instead produce a fantasy film with a similar atmosphere. Fantasy author Neil Gaiman and artist Dave McKean were called in to write and direct a film similar in spirit to Labyrinth, and MirrorMask was ultimately released in selected theaters in 2005 after premiering at the Sundance Film Festival. On January 22, 2016, Sony Pictures announced that a reboot is in development with Lisa Henson as producer and Nicole Perlman attached as the screenwriter. However, on January 25, Perlman confirmed on Twitter that, while she is working on a Labyrinth project with the Jim Henson Company, it is not a remake or reboot. Perlman also discussed the timing of the rumors in conjunction with David Bowie's death and said that, "Henson Co & I started talking in late 2014, so the timing of these rumors is so upsetting. I would never seek to profit from Bowie's death."

== In other media ==
=== Books ===
Since its release, a number of books based on Labyrinth have been published. The Goblins of Labyrinth is a book containing Brian Froud's concept art for the film with descriptions by Terry Jones. It was published in 1986 and reissued in a deluxe expanded 20th anniversary edition in 2006. A concurrent novelization of the film was written by British author A. C. H. Smith which, along with Smith's novelization of The Dark Crystal, was reprinted with illustrations and Jim Henson's notes by Archaia Publishing in 2014. The film was adapted into picture book form as Labyrinth: The Storybook, written by Louise Gikow with illustrations by Bruce McNally, and Labyrinth: The Photo Album, written by Rebecca Grand with photographs taken by John Brown from the film set. Other tie-in adaptations included a read-along storybook produced by Buena Vista Records, which came with either a 7" 33⅓ RPM record or cassette tape.

In 2019, Boom! Studios published Labyrinth: A Discovery Adventure, a hidden picture book illustrated by Laura Langston and Kate Sherron. Macmillan published Labyrinth: The ABC Storybook, an alphabet book by Luke Flowers, in 2020. Insight Kids published Labyrinth: Straight to the Castle, an interactive pop-up book for preschoolers by Erin Hunting, in 2021, and released Labyrinth: Goodnight, Goblin King, a bedtime story book, in September 2023. In 2022, Insight Editions published Labyrinth: Bestiary, an in-universe "guidebook" to the various characters and settings of the film, illustrated by Iris Compiet with text by S. T. Bende.

=== Video games ===
The film was adapted for the Commodore 64 and Apple II home computers in 1986 as Labyrinth: The Computer Game. Different versions were also released in Japan only the following year for the Family Computer console and MSX computer under the title of Labyrinth: Maō no Meikyū (Labyrinth: Maze of the Goblin King), developed by Atlus and published by Tokuma Shoten in association with Activision and Henson Associates.

Mighty Coconut, developer of the virtual reality game Walkabout Mini Golf, released in 2022 an add-on to the game called Walkabout Mini Golf: Labyrinth, which features a 36-hole mini-golf course set in the world of Labyrinth.

=== Pinball machines ===
The film was adapted into a pinball machine by Barrels of Fun in 2023. The game has sold over 1000 units and is still in production, being the first game produced by Barrels of Fun. In general, the game received positive reviews from the public, with it having an 8.4/10 on Pinside.

=== Comic books ===
Marvel Comics published a three-issue comic book adaptation of Labyrinth which was first released in a single volume as Marvel Super Special #40 in 1986.

Tokyopop published a manga-style four-volume comic sequel between 2006 and 2010 called Return to Labyrinth, written by Jake T. Forbes and illustrated by Chris Lie, with cover art by Kouyu Shurei and in partnership with The Jim Henson Company. Return to Labyrinth follows the adventures of Toby as a teenager when he is tricked into returning to the Labyrinth by Jareth.

Archaia Entertainment announced in 2011 that it was developing a prequel graphic novel about the story of how Jareth became the Goblin King in collaboration with The Jim Henson Company. Project editor Stephen Christy described the graphic novel as a "very tragic story" featuring a teenaged Jareth and said that it does not feature Sarah or Toby. In early stages of development, there were plans for the novel to integrate music into the plot in some way. David Bowie was approached by Archaia to seek permission to use his likeness and ascertain if he wished to have any involvement in the project. Brian Froud was set to design characters as a creative consultant on the project and produce covers for the graphic novel. Reported to be about a young Jareth who is taken into the Labyrinth by a witch, the novel's official synopsis describes Jareth's plot as his "attempt to rescue his true love from the clutches of the wicked and beautiful Goblin Queen". The graphic novel was initially set for release at the end of 2012 but was repeatedly delayed. Its scheduled April 2014 release slot was replaced by Archaia's reissue of the Labyrinth novelization.

Archaia released a Labyrinth short story titled Hoggle and the Worm for Free Comic Book Day on May 5, 2012 and another titled Sir Didymus' Grand Day on May 4, 2013. Archaia published Labyrinth: 30th Anniversary Special, a collection of seven short stories, in 2016 to mark the film's 30th anniversary. Cory Godbey's stories from this collection were also released in picture book form as Labyrinth Tales. Another six-story collection was released the following year, titled Labyrinth: 2017 Special. In 2018, the two were compiled as Labyrinth: Shortcuts, which also included two new stories, and another three-story collection was released as Labyrinth: Under the Spell.

Between 2018 and 2019, Archaia published Labyrinth: Coronation, a 12-issue comic series written by Simon Spurrier and illustrated by Daniel Bayliss. The series is a prequel about how Jareth became the Goblin King. It began with officials of the 1790s Venice. The story revolves around an infant Jareth who has been stolen by the previous ruler of the labyrinth the Owl King and follows the quest of Jareth's mother Maria to rescue her son. In 2020, Archaia published Labyrinth: Masquerade, a one-shot story set during the film's masquerade dream sequence, written by Lara Elena Donnelly with art by Pius Bak, Samantha Dodge, and French Carlomango.

Archaia published a graphic novel adaptation of Smith's Labyrinth novelization in September 2024, adapted by writer Kyla Vanderklugt and artist Giorgio Spalletta.

== Stage adaptation ==
In 2016, Brian Froud expressed that he would like to see Labyrinth adapted as a stage musical with live puppetry and special effects, remarking that it would be "an absolute gift to do it on stage. People would come and sing the songs and dress up, I think." Brian Henson announced that the Jim Henson Company was working on a "stage show, a big theatrical version" of Labyrinth, in April 2018. He said that the production was not intended for Broadway theatre but could potentially take place on London's West End.

== Proposed sequel ==
In January 2016, Nicole Perlman announced that she had been hired to write the script for the sequel. By April 2017, Fede Álvarez signed on as director, as well as co-writer with Jay Basu. Henson's daughter Lisa Henson was named as producer. By October 2018, Álvarez confirmed that the script was complete. In April 2020, however, Álvarez announced that he had stepped down as director. In May 2020, Scott Derrickson, known for directing Doctor Strange, was announced as director. Maggie Levin joined him in writing the script for the film. The Jim Henson Company's Brian Henson was set as the executive producer and confirmed Lisa Henson as producer.

In February 2021, Jennifer Connelly revealed that she "had conversations" about being involved in the Labyrinth sequel but was unsure about what would happen.

In October 2023, Derrickson stated he was unsure whether the sequel would be made, as the project was "so imaginative and surreal" that he believed it would be difficult to make commercially viable. In February 2024, Brian Henson confirmed that the sequel was still in development despite setbacks, although the project may be different from the Derrickson version. Lisa Henson revealed the same month that the reason for delay was that "We just haven't been able to get the script right. We've had a couple of scripts written, and we're gonna start over again. We're gonna start with a new script and a new director so it won't be anytime soon."

In December 2024, news broke of Robert Eggers being tapped to direct and co-write a follow-up to Labyrinth alongside Sjón. Chris Columbus, Eleanor Columbus, and Lisa Henson were all confirmed to be producing with Brian Henson executive producing. In the same report, it was revealed that Alexander Skarsgård had been previously spoken with about taking up the mantle of Jareth in a prior version of the project.

== Bibliography ==
- Block, Paula M.; Erdmann, Terry J. (2016). Labyrinth: The Ultimate Visual History. London: Titan Books. ISBN 978-1-78565-435-0.
- Froud, Brian; Jones, Terry (2006) [1986]. The Goblins of Labyrinth (20th Anniversary ed.). New York: Abrams. ISBN 978-0-8109-7055-7.
- Howard, Kim (1993). Life Before And After Monty Python. New York: Plexus. ISBN 0-312-08695-4.
- Jones, Brian Jay (2013). Jim Henson: The Biography. Random House. ISBN 9780345526137.
- McCall, Douglas (2013). Monty Python: A Chronology, 1969-2012 (2nd ed.). McFarland & Company. ISBN 978-0-7864-7811-8.
- Pegg, Nicholas (2002). The Complete David Bowie. London: Reynolds & Hearn. ISBN 1-903111-40-4.
- Smith, A. C. H. (1986). Labyrinth: A Novel Based On The Jim Henson Film. New York: Henry Holt. ISBN 978-0-03-007322-9.
