= Angie Passmore =

British puppeteer and actress (born 1952)

Angie Passmore (born 1952) is a British puppeteer and actress who has worked on Spitting Image and in various productions for The Jim Henson Company including The Muppets, Fraggle Rock, Labyrinth (1986) and performed as the title character in Jim Henson's Mother Goose Stories. She also puppeteered for Doctor Who (1978) and in the film Little Shop of Horrors (1986) which was directed by Frank Oz.

She was born in Cheshire in 1952 as Angela J. Jucker, the daughter of Eleanora June née Dore (1918–1998) and Adrian Fontana Jucker (1920–2012), a bomb disposal expert who served during the Battle of El-Alamein during World War II and who was awarded the Military Cross. In 1977 she married Peter A. K. Passmore in London. The marriage was later dissolved.

As an actress she played Mrs Dog in Hot Dog (1982) and Helen Bowman in the episode 'Strangled' in the series Saturday Night Thriller (1982).

Passmore currently lives in Barnstaple in Devon.

== Performer Credits ==
- Doctor Who (1978) – The Stones of Blood – Megara operator
- We'll Tell You a Story (1980) – presenter
- Labyrinth (1986) – Goblins (puppeteer only)
- Little Shop of Horrors (1986) – puppeteer
- The Ghost of Faffner Hall (1989) – Zola, Tutie
- Jim Henson's Mother Goose Stories – Mother Goose, Mole
- The Muppet Christmas Carol (1992) – additional Muppet performer
- Muppet Treasure Island (1996) – additional Muppet performer
- The Happytime Murders (2018) - additional puppeteer
- The Dark Crystal: Age of Resistance (2019 TV series) – additional puppeteer
