= Oliver Smith (cricketer) =

English cricketer

Personal information
- Full name: Oliver Charles Kennedy Smith
- Born: 29 October 1967 (age 59); Meriden, Warwickshire, England
- Batting: Left-handed
- Bowling: Right-arm off break
- Relatives: A. C. H. Smith (father)

Domestic team information
- Years: Team
- 1987: Gloucestershire

Career statistics
Competition	First-class
Matches	1
Runs scored	15
Batting average	7.50
100s/50s	0/0
Top score	14
Catches/stumpings	0/–
- Source: Cricinfo, 30 July 2011

Oliver Charles Kennedy Smith (born 29 October 1967) is a former English cricketer. Smith was a left-handed batsman who bowled right-arm off break. He was born in Meriden, Warwickshire.

Smith made 3 Youth Test appearances for England Young Cricketers against Sri Lanka Young Cricketers in 1987, with some success, scoring a single century and half century. Later in 1987, he made his only first-class appearance for Gloucestershire against a Rest of the World XI. In this match, he was dismissed by Maninder Singh for a single in Gloucestershire's first-innings, while in their second-innings he was dismissed by John Bracewell for 14 runs. He made no further appearances for Gloucestershire, following spells in the Second XI, he formally left the county at the end of the 1990 season.

Oliver is the son of novelist and playwright A. C. H. Smith.
