= Return to Labyrinth =

Original English-language manga series

- Cover of Jim Henson's Return to Labyrinth 1 (August 2006), art by Kouyu Shurei
- Genre: Fantasy; Based on Labyrinth
- Author: Jake T. Forbes
- Illustrator: Chris Lie, Kouyu Shurei (cover art)
- Publisher: Tokyopop
- Original run: 2006–2010
- Volumes: 4

Return to Labyrinth is an original English-language manga based on the Jim Henson 1986 fantasy film Labyrinth. Jake T. Forbes is credited as the creator, and Chris Lie is the illustrator. The covers for all four volumes were drawn by Kouyu Shurei. It is published by Tokyopop.

Return to Labyrinth is a four-part series starting with Volume 1 that was released in August 2006. Volume 2 was released in October 2007, and was originally going to be titled Goblin Prince of the Labyrinth, but instead the Return to Labyrinth title is used for all volumes. Originally planned as a three-part series, it was announced at the end of the second volume that the story would be expanded to four volumes. Volume 3 was released on May 12, 2009. The final volume was released on August 3, 2010. The story takes place about thirteen years after the events of Labyrinth and centers around Toby, who by this time has grown up into a teenager. The series received mixed reviews.

== Development ==
The Jim Henson Company announced in 2005 that it was collaborating with Tokyopop on two graphic novels based on Jim Henson's feature films The Dark Crystal and Labyrinth.

According to Tim Beedle, a Tokyopop editor who worked on Return to Labyrinth, the manga came about when Forbes suggested to the publisher that Labyrinth and The Dark Crystal had potential to be spun-off as original graphic novels. They contacted the Jim Henson Company, where Michael Polis, the Senior VP of Marketing and Home Entertainment, had been considering spinning both properties into comics. Rob Valois, an editor on the manga, had previously worked for the Jim Henson Company and was able to help organise a deal between the two companies. According to Beedle, Labyrinth and The Dark Crystal were believed to be suitable properties to be spun into manga format due to the length considered necessary to explore their fantasy worlds, which would not suit a shorter comic format. In addition, both films have a large female fan base, "just like manga does".

Beedle stated that The Goblins of Labyrinth, a companion book to the film by its conceptual designer, Brian Froud, was used as a reference for Return to Labyrinth in order to "preserve the authenticity of the world" of the film.

Due to high sales and positive response from readers to the first volume, Return to Labyrinth was expanded from three volumes to four. Beedle stated that in response to fan feedback from the first volume requesting more of the characters Sarah and Jareth, the creators "expanded on a subplot featuring Jareth and Sarah" in the later volumes.

== Synopsis ==
=== Volume I ===
It has been over a decade since the events of Labyrinth, wherein Sarah Williams defeated the Goblin King and rescued her baby half-brother, Toby. Jareth, the Goblin King, has watched as Toby grows up into a teenager, secretly giving him everything he desired regardless of its attainability, propriety or scale. Through the years, Toby noticed the strange way all his wishes came true, but never understood the reason behind it. Despite this, he seems to have grown up into a reasonably well-adjusted teenage boy. He has no memory of the time that he was kidnapped by goblins and no idea of Sarah's rescue of him. Sarah herself has become a teacher.

Jareth has been watching Toby, it seems, because he still intends for Toby to become his heir. A deadline is drawing near and other individuals, including a mysterious queen and the mayor of Goblin City, are eying the throne. Jareth eventually lures Toby back to the Labyrinth, where he meets various creatures, including some that his sister encountered during her own adventure. One, Hana, is a fairy whose wings were stolen from her. Toby promises to help her get them back. Toby also meets Moppet, a servant girl who always wears a mask.

=== Volume II ===
Immediately following Volume 1, Jareth names Toby his heir and then disappears. Mizumi, the Queen of Moraine, and her two daughters decide to stay with Toby in the Goblin Castle "to help him out". After a brief scuffle in the "History of Toby" museum, Toby embraces his destiny as the new leader of the goblins and begins training for the role. Mizumi volunteers to teach Toby magic, giving him a small vial of magical water from Moraine. During their lessons Mizumi reveals her past romantic history with Jareth and his subsequent building of the Labyrinth "to keep everyone, including [Mizumi] out".

A flashback shows Jareth after Sarah's retrieval of Toby. He appears frustrated and unsettled, and the goblins, who believe that he is losing his powers, prepare to revolt. Jareth visits Mizumi in Moraine, where he requests that she prepare an ablation for him. When Mizumi asks what he offers in return, he offers a wager, claiming that if he wins, he keeps the ablation, but if he loses then "the goblin kingdom and its king are [Mizumi's]" to handle as she pleases. Mizumi agrees and gives Jareth thirteen years wherein to complete the wager; exactly what the wager entails is not revealed to the reader.

Toby's studies interfere with his quest to find Hana's wings; therefore Hana begins searching for them alone. With the aid of Moppet, Hana discovers a locked door in a far tower of the Goblin Castle. After breaking through it, they discover a room closely resembling the bedroom that Sarah had as a teenager, though it also features a closet full of elaborate clothes and a dungeon lock on the door. At this point, Moppet begins to feel uncomfortable because of recognizing the music playing from the music box ("As the World Falls Down") and having a vision of Jareth demanding her love. Drumlin, Mizumi's daughter, locks them in the room and starts destroying it.

During this time, Mizumi takes Toby to the Ministry of Prophecies where they select a prophecy for Toby. Toby only hears part of the prophecy, leaving out a dangerous omen of things to come. When Toby and Mizumi return to the castle, Toby sees Moppet falling. Desperate to save her, he magically extends his arms to catch her, but in the process of saving her life knocks her mask off to reveal her true face. Toby instantly recognizes her as a younger version of his sister, Sarah, but having pale hair and different coloring.

Elsewhere, two reptilian creatures in cloaks discuss a plot against someone of importance. The scene then cuts to one of Sarah, who is grading papers when she hears a knock on the door. When she opens it, it reveals Jareth standing before her.

=== Volume III ===
After Moppet's face is revealed, Drumlin is taken to the dungeons, and Mizumi and Spittledrum sit Toby down for an explanation. One of Mizumi's powers, she says, is the ability to create ablations, to remove traits from living beings and give them form and autonomy. Moppet, she reveals, is the ablation that she created as part of her bargain with Jareth. At his request, she stole the part of Sarah Williams that frightened him the most: her dreams. (At about the same time, Toby recalls, the real Sarah gave up on theater and fairy tales and stopped telling him stories about her friends from the Labyrinth.) It is implied but not explicitly stated that the terms of Jareth and Mizumi's wager were that Jareth had to get Moppet to love him. For several years, Jareth kept Moppet a prisoner in the locked tower room. This temporarily restored his power over the goblin kingdom, but when he could not make Moppet love him, his old problems returned. Whether Moppet escaped from Jareth or was discarded is left unclear, but Spittledrum tells Toby of how he found Moppet among the rubbish people and brought her back to the city. One day, he says, Jareth saw Moppet and confronted Spittledrum. He told Spittledrum to keep Moppet out of the palace and gave him a peach. If Moppet ever mentioned anything about a locked room, he said, Spittledrum was to give Moppet the peach. Closing the meeting, Mizumi says that she is fully capable of returning an ablation to its former host, but that this will wipe out the ablation's separate memories and experiences. She also tells Toby that if an ablation dies, the host dies with it, and vice versa. When Toby muses that he wishes to summon Sarah to the labyrinth so that Mizumi can restore her dreams, Moppet objects and runs away.

Meanwhile, in the human world, Jareth has gone to see Sarah. She does not immediately recognize him, but accepts his explanation that they know each other from the theater. During this meeting, Jareth seems disappointed that Sarah has made so little of herself but notices that her strong will is still there. It is also shown that Sarah has no memory of ever knowing Jareth, though why this is not revealed. After leaving Sarah, Jareth seeks and finds a specific goblin, Cob, who had been banished to the human world many years earlier. From him, he retrieves a tiny sliver of his own heart, which he had splintered off for safekeeping before his power began to wane; it is as potent as ever. With a good portion of his magic restored, Jareth plots his revenge on Sarah. He creates the Enigma Lain theater in an outdoor park and sends Sarah a ticket.

Mizumi visits Drumlin in the dungeons. Though Drumlin apologizes, Mizumi tells her that it is too late and that she has to go "home". As Moulin watches from a hidden place, Mizumi reabsorbs Drumlin. Drumlin and Moulin, it is revealed, are Mizumi's own ablations. Drumlin had been an ablation of her hope. Moulin decides to help Toby against Mizumi, but is caught and captured by Mizumi's servant Esker.

Before the coronation, one of the strange reptilian creatures meets Toby and offers him a warning in unintelligible anagrams. He also gives Toby a gift, a small medallion. Toby proceeds to his coronation. After a few long rituals, Toby goes through an ordeal in which he locates the Pathfinder, giving him direct control over the Labyrinth's walls. Shortly after this, Mizumi announces her triumph over Jareth and claims the Labyrinth for her own, chaining Toby. The goblin army resists, but Mizumi's own forces rain in from above and defeat them. Candlewic, the captain of the guard, betrays Toby and Spittledrum to Mizumi.

Mizumi confronts Moulin in the dungeons. Moulin and Drumlin, she says, are both ablations of the emotions that had bound Mizumi to Jareth. When Moulin asks why Mizumi bothered to create beings who could only die with her or as part of her, Mizumi answers, "There is another way. I just didn't want them to know that." Despite this, Mizumi is about to reabsorb Moulin as she did Drumlin, but is interrupted by Esker, who reports that Jareth has made contact with Sarah in the human world. This news upsets Mizumi, who orders Esker to go to the human world and stop Jareth, but Esker explains that he cannot leave the Labyrinth; the Pathmaker is stopping him. Mizumi muses that there may be another way, and sends Esker to kill Moppet so that Sarah will die too.

The volume closes with Toby, Skub, Spittledrum and Moulin imprisoned, Moppet climbing the rubbish hills with her peach, and Sarah walking into Jareth's trap.

=== Volume IV ===
Toby is trapped in the Oubliette and nearly loses his mind when he is finally taken to see Mizumi. She reveals that as Jareth's heir, Toby is bound to carry his title and his heart, which Toby is unable to sustain. To explain, she divulges more of her past with Jareth and how they initially met. Mizumi had instantly fallen in love with him, but Jareth's interest in her had been fickle and she demanded to see his heart. In response, Jareth challenged her to find it within the Labyrinth; if Mizumi found it, his heart would be hers, but in exchange, she gave him her word that she would never allow his Labyrinth to be harmed. When she could not find his heart, Jareth insulted her—though she had given everything she could give him, he still found her shallow. In the present, Toby allows Mizumi make him the vessel of her will in order to save his friends and the crumbling Labyrinth.

Meanwhile, Hana and Stank end up finding Moulin; freeing her, she joins them as they set off to find Moppet and save Toby. In the wastes, Moppet takes a bite of Jareth's peach and becomes trapped in one of Sarah's greatest dreams: her mother remained married to her father and Sarah is able to pursue her dream of becoming a stage actress. While enchanted, she is attacked by Esker, who has been ordered by Mizumi to kill Moppet. Moulin, Hana, and Stank arrive and manage to save Moppet after a difficult fight, but are trapped when the Labyrinth collapses around them. When Toby arrives to save them, Moulin reveals that Moppet, being made of dreams, cannot be freed easily from Jareth's dreamtrap. To protect Sarah and Moppet, Toby traps them in an enchanted prison and returns to Mizumi.

Sarah has walked into Jareth's trap, which features a puppet show before a goblin audience. The show follows Sarah's entire life, including her forgotten adventure in the Labyrinth and ending with how her life has become mediocre. Recognizing Jareth at last, he offers to guide her with the last of his power and let her dreams thrive again before taking her into the world of the Labyrinth. In the dreamtrap, Moppet realizes the flaw within the dream and how Sarah was forced to give up her dream of studying at Juilliard to become an actress. Moppet, now awake, sets off with Moulin, Hana, and Stank to find Sarah and stop Jareth's plans, and they are freed from Toby's prison by Hoggle and Ludo.

Toby, uncertain about how to control the dissenting goblins and feeling alone, wanders the Labyrinth until he finds a fountain and is confronted by Jareth. When Jareth criticizes Toby's inability to know what he really wants to do, Toby wishes Jareth out of his life. Toby is transformed into a being resembling Jareth and when he returns to Mizumi, he declares his intention to tear down the Labyrinth and rebuild it. Frustrated with Toby's transformation, Mizumi is encouraged by an illusion of Drumlin to find the person who will lead her to Jareth.

Under Jareth's spell, Sarah observes Moppet's progress as a new world shaped by Sarah's will is created. Despite Hoggle and Ludo's apprehension, Moppet is determined to find Sarah; she asks that they support Toby and parts ways with them. When her group reaches a door, Hana picks its brain to get the answer to its riddle and open it, though only Moulin and Moppet make it through. They arrive in a hall of mirrors that all show what they really are and an altar that requires a sacrifice before the next door is opened. When Moulin looks into a mirror, Mizumi finds her and passes through the mirror. To save Moppet, Moulin attempts to stab herself, since as Mizumi's ablation of regret, Mizumi will die as well. Failing that, Moulin forces Mizumi to see her regrets in a mirror, thus severing the link between them. Mizumi stabs Moulin to open the door to Jareth, with Moppet following her. When Moppet finds her, Mizumi has reached a dead end. Realizing that she will never know what Jareth desires, Mizumi creates a door for Moppet to find Sarah, deciding that she can wait for Jareth long after Sarah is gone.

When the goblins initiate their revolt, Toby's attempts to control them with force falls apart when Mizumi cancels the contract she made with Jareth. Realizing that he has never been able to make decisions of his own since becoming the Goblin King, Toby relinquishes his role as king and ends the revolt with the goblins as his friends. Meanwhile, Sarah has completed her new world with Jareth nearly able to control her. However, Moppet arrives and confronts him with his attempts to cage her and risking the entire Labyrinth for his own desire, forcing Jareth to justify rescuing Sarah's abandoned dying dreams. After Sarah orders that Jareth show her the fates of her friends, she offers her will to Jareth to save the Labyrinth and frees Moppet from their connection by realizing her own dreams. Jareth is able to repair the Labyrinth and reluctantly accepts Toby's demand to allow everyone to find their own paths.

Upon returning to their world, Sarah realizes her dreams by writing stories, allowing the existence of everyone in the Labyrinth to continue, while Toby begins to step away from escaping loneliness through fantasies and finds a friend.

== Characters ==
Jareth, the Goblin King

The King of the Labyrinth, a vast kingdom within a realm known as the Underground. According to the manga, Jareth has ruled the Labyrinth for 1,300 years. Though he appears human, he has several inhuman abilities including the ability to form crystal orbs with which he can create illusions of all types or view things from a distance. He is also a master of disguise capable of physical transformations, such as changing into a barn owl. In the first volume, he poses as Toby's high school guidance counselor. He does not appear to have aged between the film and the manga. It is revealed that Jareth has been watching Toby grow up through the years and granting his wishes, supposedly in order to prepare Toby into becoming his heir.

In Volume II, more of the history of the Labyrinth is revealed. Part of Jareth's personal history is revealed as well: at one time or another Jareth had a relationship with Mizumi, Queen of Moraine. What exactly their relationship was is left open to interpretation, but it appears to have been a romantic one (Mizumi claims to have loved Jareth), though Jareth seems to have broken their bonds. Mizumi claims that the creation of the Labyrinth was an externalization of Jareth's powers and desire to isolate himself; however, in allowing one person, presumably Sarah, to enter the Labyrinth and in being defeated by that person, his power began to wane. Volume II also further explores Jareth's intentions and feelings towards Sarah, long speculated upon by fans of the film. The manga shows Jareth fixated on Sarah, genuinely frustrated by her refusal of his offer to stay in the Labyrinth as his beloved queen: there is some question as to whether Jareth is free to leave the Labyrinth. On one hand, Toby is warned that, as the Goblin King, he may not leave the Labyrinth unless he is summoned. Jareth's appearances to Toby and Sarah might be explained by their wishes for outside help. His only uninvited visit to the ordinary world takes place after his abdication. However, he is shown visiting Mizumi in Moraine while he is still Goblin King.

He was supposed to be without power following his abdication, but Volume III shows the extent of his fore-planning. Once in the human world, Jareth visits a goblin exile who has been keeping a fragment of Jareth's power preserved for him in an artefact, enough for the former Goblin King to carry out whatever plan he has for Sarah.

Toby Williams

The baby whom Jareth kidnapped after he was wished away by his half-sister, Sarah. In the film it was hinted that Jareth became fond of Toby. In the manga, Toby has grown into a high school student who displays characteristics similar to those shown by his half-sister in the film, such as a love of theater and fantasy. He has no memories of his previous time in the Labyrinth nor of Sarah rescuing him. In Volume 1 of the manga, he returns to the Labyrinth after a goblin steals his homework and arrives in a ballroom in the castle beyond the Goblin City, where Jareth declares that he is to become the new king of the Goblin Kingdom. Toby spends most of the second volume coming to terms with his inheritance of the Labyrinth and becoming its king, which he has decided to view as a learning experience.

Moppet

A polite and passive girl who resides in the Goblin City as a servant to the Goblin Mayor. She wears a goblin mask to hide her human face. Moppet is shown to have a crush on Candelwic, a tough goblin guardsman, but she seems to be too shy to say so. She dances with Toby in the ballroom before Jareth's declaration. In Volume II, it is revealed that she had been found by one of the trash ladies and then given to Spittledrum as payment for her taxes. Moppet appears to have no memory of anything that had happened to her before this. When Moppet's goblin mask is removed, Toby instantly recognizes her as looking like Sarah, though her connection to Toby's sister remains unexplained until Volume III—she is an ablation of Sarah. Ablations are independent beings created by Mizumi from aspects of people—in this case, Sarah's dreams. In volume IV she travels with Moulin through the traps laid by Mizumi, only to find Sarah in Jareth's clutches. Jareth reveals that he had asked Mizumi to create the ablation of Sarah's dreams in hopes of rescuing them after Sarah rejected them, attempting to control Moppet in hopes using her to restore his power. When she retorts at this, Sarah asks for Moppet's help in rebuilding the Labyrinth and disappears afterward.

Hana

A faery whose wings were plucked by goblins as punishment for minor theft. She has a fierce temper and is easily agitated. She befriends Toby during his journey into the Labyrinth and he promises to help her find her wings. When Toby's studies prevent him from helping her search for her wings, she becomes agitated with him and goes with Moppet to find them alone.

Stank

Hana's friend and steed. Stank looks like a smaller version of Ludo, having a round body, thick fur, and two short, twisting horns. Like Ludo, he can make rocks and bricks move by calling out to them. Like Ludo, he speaks only in short one- or two-word phrases, namely 'Arooo?'. Although good-natured, Stank has a number of unhygienic habits. In Volume IV Stank eats up Toby's present to Hana and sprouts wings, causing Hana to sigh 'Close enough'.

Spittledrum

The somewhat incompetent mayor of the goblin city. He has served Jareth for a long time, and seems to think highly of himself as each time he comes to believe that Jareth will retire from being Goblin King, Spittledrum prepares a speech to accept becoming Jareth's successor. When Toby is named the heir to the Labyrinth, Spittledrum is initially upset but later looks after Toby. Though acute observation, he is able to determine Moppet's origins before she became his servant and forces Mizumi to reveal that Moppet was an ablation created in a wager with Jareth. One panel in Volume II gives his first name as "Panjan".

Mizumi

The Queen of Moraine, a land known for its beauty and dangerous waters. Known also as the Queen of Cups, Mizumi is a powerful magician and an icy beauty who was once very close to Jareth. Soon after Jareth is defeated by Sarah, he approaches Mizumi to present a wager offering "the Goblin Kingdom and its king" if she wins in exchange for creating an ablation for him. As of Volume III, the terms of the wager itself are unrevealed.

Mizumi helps Toby prepare for his coronation so that she can seize control herself. To do so, she tutors Toby in magic, alternately believing he is inept but has tremendous potential, in hopes of finding the Pathmaker, who controls the Labyrinth's shifts and changes. She has two daughters, Moulin and Drumlin, and a cold bodyguard named Esker. Volume III reveals that Moulin and Drumlin are actually ablations of Mizumi, created to rid herself of the emotions that kept her pining for Jareth. Mizumi had a stormy relationship with Jareth in Volume IV and wanted to see his heart, but the Goblin King storms off after their argument, saying that he would rather rule over the Goblins. She also stabs Moulin for her treachery.

Drumlin

One of Mizumi's daughters. She is very obese as a result of her ability to drink moisture from anything she touches. In Volume III, it is revealed that Drumlin is an externalization of Mizumi's hope. She is reabsorbed by Mizumi when the Queen of Cups regards her as too much of a liability, though Drumlin briefly rematerializes once Mizumi realizes the value of hope.

Moulin

Mizumi's other daughter. She carries a rain cloud named Nimbus, having the power to control water, and an umbrella to keep herself dry. Moulin is also a skilled fencer, sparring with Sir Didymus in a demonstration during Toby's physical education lesson, and she preferred dancing with Moppet to dancing with Toby at the Goblin Ball. She often reads a book that details the all impossible outcomes that the reader can imagine. Upon learning that she and Drumlin are Mizumi's ablations, Moulin becomes rebellious and is nearly reabsorbed, though Mizumi is distracted and delays the task. She joins Moppet, Hana, and Stank to find Sarah Williams in Volume IV. When she encounters Mizumi again, it is revealed that Moulin is an externalization of Mizumi's regret. By forcing Mizumi to realize her regret without Moulin, the link between them is broken, allowing Mizumi to stab her without repercussion.

Esker

Mizumi's servant. He is tall and imposing, always wearing a skull-like mask (unless that's his face). Unlike Moulin and Drumlin, Esker does not show much interest in anything except his obedience to Mizumi.

Sarah Williams

The protagonist of the film. In the manga, she is a supporting character, living a subdued life as an English teacher and sharing a close relationship with her half-brother, Toby. A stylized, younger version of Sarah appears frequently in flashbacks and in scenes of Jareth's imagination. Mizumi briefly takes this form while mocking Jareth about his apparent loss of power. After leaving the Labyrinth to Toby, Jareth approaches Sarah in the human world and is disappointed to find she does not remember him and has discarded her fantasy-related dreams for a more practical life. Jareth winds up luring Sarah into a trap that magically persuades her to take up her old dreams again before bringing her into the Labyrinth world, where he hopes for Sarah's will and imagination will reawaken and create a new and perfect world.

Skub

The small goblin who stole Toby's homework and led him into the Labyrinth. A failure in the goblin army, he has become Toby's personal chef.

Dingle

The little imp that rings Moppet's alarm clock.

The Brick Layer

A spider-like goblin that builds the outer brick walls of the Labyrinth. His perplexing remarks help Toby learn how to maneuver within the Labyrinth.

Hoggle

A cowardly dwarf-goblin that once worked for Jareth but became loyal to Sarah in the film. At that time, Jareth had threatened Hoggle to turn him Prince of the Bog of Eternal Stench if Sarah ever kissed him. In the manga, it is shown that Jareth has fulfilled this promise, and Hoggle claims to resent Sarah for this development.

Sir Didymus

A small dog-fox goblin first seen in the film. He has a loyal canine steed named Ambrosious. In the manga he is seen sending invitations for Jareth's ball. He becomes Toby's physical education teacher. He is on friendly terms with Moppet.

Professors Maelgrot, Nymblie, Glosspan, Glokensteal, and Jodhspur

Toby's teachers in how to become Goblin King. Maelgrot is an artistic goblin who has made the "Museum of Toby", of which he is the founder as well as the collector of Toby's old junk, including Lancelot. Nymblie is Toby's drama teacher and fashion advisor. Glockensteal is Toby's economics teacher, money grubber. For goblins, "economics" seems to be mostly about the art of hoarding and swindling. Toby's philosophy teacher is a noted philosopher, Glosspan, while Jodhspur is Toby's jousting teacher.

Ludo

An orange yeti who was being tormented by goblins until Sarah rescued him in the film. He makes a cameo in Volume 1 of the manga.

The Blue Worm

A small blue worm who wears a red scarf and lives in the brick wall of the first passage of the Labyrinth. He had encountered Sarah in her journey in Labyrinth, and here he briefly encounters Toby. His wife is the Missus, who was never seen in the film but seen briefly in the manga.

The Flegworts

An elderly goblin couple. They own a shop where they sell shoes to their fellow goblins as food. For a time, Hana lives with them, saving their business by making shoes.

Irene Williams

Toby's mother, who in the manga is shown as very stern with her son. Irene and Toby have a cold relationship, while Sarah and Toby are shown as very close.

Mr. Morrisey

Toby's high school math teacher. He believes Toby is cheating on his test, though this is really the result of Jareth's intervention. He sends Toby to the guidance counselor, who is Jareth in disguise.

== Release ==
Written by Jake T. Forbes and illustrated by Chris Lie, Return to Labyrinth was published in North America by Tokyopop. Four volumes were released from August 8, 2006, to August 3, 2010. It was distributed by HarperCollins in the U.S. and by Madman Entertainment in Australia and New Zealand.

=== Volume list ===
No.	North American release date	North American ISBN
1	August 8, 2006	978-1-59816-725-2
2	October 9, 2007	978-1-59816-726-9
3	May 1, 2009	978-1-59816-727-6
4	August 3, 2010	978-1-4278-1687-0

=== Digital release ===
Return to Labyrinth was made available as a digital download through digital publishing website Zinio in June 2010.

== Reception ==
=== Commercial reception ===
The first volume debuted at the 40th spot in the list of 100 best-selling graphic novels for August 2006, based on Diamond Comic Distributors' U.S. sales, with an estimated 2,400 copies sold. The second volume appeared at the 58th spot with an estimated 2,204 copies sold in October 2007. In May 2009, the third volume sold an estimated 1,386 copies and reached the 76th spot on the list. It also reached the 19th spot in Bookscan's list of the top twenty best-selling graphic novels for May 2009, and ranked 4th on the New York Times manga bestseller list for the week of May 10 to 16. In August 2010, the fourth volume reached the 74th spot on the Diamond U.S. best-selling graphic novels list, with an estimated 1,100 copies sold, and the 19th spot on Bookscan's top twenty best-selling graphic novels list.

=== Critical response ===
Return to Labyrinth received mixed reviews from critics. Kristy Valenti, who works for The Comics Journal and Fantagraphics Books, wrote that the series "is the most successful at both whetting the nostalgia of the film's cult audience while mining the film's world-building for further narrative opportunities"; she noted "technical glitches" in the first volume, and the lack of bishōnen and bishōjo designs, which she thought the manga needed. IGN's A.E Sparrow praised the sequel, and liked how it was "mindful of the source material, but unafraid to strike out and cover some new ground as well" by including new characters. Reviewing the first volume for Kliatt, Jennifer Feigelman found the manga "falls somewhat short in its story development" and that the character of Toby was not well constructed. Johanna Draper Carlson, a longtime reviewer for Publishers Weekly and fan of the film, felt that the shift of Sarah to Toby as the protagonist weakened the sequel since it made the premise of the series common.

While writing that the manga "holds its own as teen fiction", Martha Cornog in Library Journal found it lacked the charm of the original story of the film and the interior artwork was of poor quality. Reviewing the first volume for Anime News Network, Carlo Santos liked its characters and humour; he criticised the "stiff character poses and an over-reliance on screentones" in the illustrations and the stalling of the main plot by excessive side stories. Katherine Dacey of PopCultureShock wrote that the interior art by Chris Lie "varied considerably from panel to panel" in the first volume, along with the narrative having a "choppy, hectic rhythm that made it read more like a Choose Your Own Adventure story than a solid fantasy novel." Dacey rated the second volume a "C+", stating that while the series' artwork and storytelling showed improvement since the first volume, the characters remained underdeveloped and the manga felt like a fan fiction that would only appeal to fans of the film. CGMagazine's James Gartler found that the manga's Japanese style of storytelling did not mesh well with the film's original designs by conceptual artist Brian Froud. Conversely, Nadia Oxford of Mania wrote that the film's settings and characters "translate very well into the manga style", noting that David Bowie (the actor who portrayed Jareth) "was a model bishōnen". Oxford rated the first volume an "A−".

According to Entertainment Weekly, the manga's large number of original characters prompted criticism from Labyrinth fans that the series was straying too far from its source material. Comic Book Resources reported that readers did not care for the new "underdeveloped" characters, and many felt mislead by the cover illustrations, which were much more lavish and detailed than the simpler, more Western-styled interior art. Readers also questioned Tokyopop's decision to expand the series from three volumes to four, resulting in a four-year gap between the release of the first and last volumes.

== Legacy ==
Return to Labyrinth was one of the top Tokyopop titles in the imprint's first decade. However, the series did not receive as positive a reception from critics and fans as Legends of the Dark Crystal, Tokyopop's manga prequel to Jim Henson's 1982 film The Dark Crystal. In 2014, Total Film included Return to Labyrinth on a list of the "50 Greatest Movie Comic Spin-Offs".

Comic Book Resources reported in 2021 that despite the continued popularity of the original film, Return to Labyrinth has been "largely forgotten", in part due to the fact that Tokyopop ceased its publishing operations less than a year after the publication of the series' last volume and the manga went out of print. The company resumed publishing manga in 2016, and creator Jake Forbes has expressed a desire to restore a number of "deleted scenes" if the series is ever republished. However, Comic Book Resources wrote that Return to Labyrinth has been "rendered solidly non-canon" by later Labyrinth comics published by Archaia Entertainment and a potential upcoming movie sequel, and that a rerelease of the manga "might confuse readers about which material should be considered 'official.'"
