= Mak Wilson =

English puppeteer and writer (born 1957)

- Born: 3 September 1957 (age 68); Consett, County Durham, England
- Other names: Mac Wilson; Malcolm Wilson
- Occupations: Puppeteer; writer; animation director; mocap artist
- Years active: 1973–2014

Mak Wilson (born 3 September 1957) is an English retired puppeteer, writer, animation director, and motion capture artist. He is also known as Mac Wilson and Malcolm Wilson.

== Early life and career ==
Wilson was born in Consett, England, but grew up in nearby Stanley, County Durham. He began his professional career in 1973 at the age of 15, but his screen physical performer and puppeteering work started in 1981 with The Dark Crystal. Wilson had previously toured on stage where he often did mime, mask and puppeteering.

From 1990 he became head puppeteer and creative advisor for the London Jim Henson's Creature Shop, but when it closed down in 2005 Mak Wilson began freelancing and worked extensively with the BBC. He was forced to retire in 2014 after his longstanding M.E./C.F.S. became too severe for him to continue. He now spends his time writing on the subjects of King Arthur and the ‘Dark Ages’ in general.

== Filmography ==
=== Film ===
- Muppets Most Wanted - UK principle puppeteer
- The Hitchhiker's Guide to the Galaxy - Vogon Interpreter (voice)
- Mee-Shee: The Water Giant - CGI animation director and CGI realtime puppeteer
- Buddy - animatronic face puppeteer of Buddy
- Doctor Dolittle - animatronic puppetry advisor
- Lost In Space - CGI animation director and CGI realtime puppeteer
- Muppet Treasure Island - CGI realtime puppeteer and singer
- The Adventures of Pinocchio - Lead animatronic puppeteer
- Loch Ness - Animatronic and CGI realtime puppeteer
- Babe - Lead animatronic puppeteer and coordinator
- Who Framed Roger Rabbit - FX puppeteer
- Teenage Mutant Ninja Turtles II: The Secret of the Ooze - Lead animatronic puppeteer of Michelangelo, coordinator and the Promoter's Aide
- Teenage Mutant Ninja Turtles (1990 film) - Lead animatronic puppeteer of Michelangelo
- The Bear - Lead animatronic puppeteer and coordinator
- Little Shop of Horrors - Audrey II lipsync puppeteer and Little Audrey II's vocal effects
- Santa Claus: The Movie - Lead animatronic puppeteer of Donna
- Labyrinth - Animatronic face puppeteer of Hoggle, Brickkeeper, Riding Goblin, Shaft of Hands, Goblins
- Return to Oz - Performer of Billina the chicken
- Greystoke - Performer of the ape Figs and vocals of the mother ape Karla
- The Dark Crystal - Stand-in performer of Scribe the Mystic

=== Television ===
- The Furchester Hotel - Harvey P. Dull, Guest characters and Puppeteer Captain - CBeebies/Sesame Street production
- Mr. Bloom's Nursery - Colin the runner bean and Tom the potato
- CBBC presentation guests - puppeteer of a mad rabbit, a wacky octopus and reindeer
- ABC Bear - The Bear and puppet choreographer - Austria
- Mongrels - Guest characters
- Doctor Who - Movement choreographer for Helen McCrory
- X-Factor with The Muppets - puppet choreographer and puppeteer
- 2007 Brit Awards - Opening of the event with the Scissor Sisters - puppet choreographer
- 2005 Brit Awards - Opening of the event with the Scissor Sisters - puppet choreographer
- Fur TV - puppeteer of Lapeno
- Jack and the Beanstalk-the True Story - animatronic puppeteer and CGI animation director
- Farscape - animatronic puppetry teacher
- Saturday Night Takeaway - puppeteer assistant to Kermit the Frog
- Fungus the Bogeyman - Fungus (through MoCap)
- The Hoobs - consultant, OB director, puppet choreographer, puppeteer
- Mopatop's Shop - Mopatop (1999-2001)
- "Bits and Bobs" - Developer, Puppet Director
- Construction Site - Lug the Dump Truck, Scooch the Dump Truck - Director and co producer
- Dinosaurs - Face/Head Operation of Earl Sinclair (Seasons 2-4)
- Jim Henson's Animal Show - Yves St. La Roache (1994), Achilles the Shark, Billy Bob the Lemur, Bosko the Baboon, Chauncey the Sea Turtle, Chaz the Chameleon, Chuck the Lion, Clive the Kiwi, Cool the Kangaroo Rat, Dooley the Armadillo, Flora the Koala, Fluke the Dolphin, Harry the Rhinoceros, Leapovitch the Frog, Morton the Beaver, Nippy the Tiger Beetle, Plunk the Sea Otter, Ringo the Elephant, Robert the Red Deer, Sean the Rabbit, Swifty the Cheetah, Victor the Rattlesnake
- Jim Henson's Mother Goose Stories - Various
- The Ghost of Faffner Hall - Farkus Faffner
- The Storyteller - Various Creature Performances

== Puppeteer ==
- Buddy - Animatronic puppeteer and Puppetry Coordinator
- Construction Site - Lead Puppeteer
- Dr. Dolittle - Animatronic puppetry teacher
- Fur TV - Puppeteer
- Jack and the Beanstalk: The Real Story - Lead Puppeteer
- Jim Henson's Mother Goose Stories - Puppet Coordinator
- Labyrinth - Goblin Performer, Puppeteer
- Little Shop of Horrors - Principal Puppeteer
- Loch Ness - Lead Puppeteer
- Lost in Space - "Blawp" animation supervisor
- Mee-Shee: The Water Giant - Animation Director, CGI Puppeteer
- Mongrels - Puppeteer
- Teenage Mutant Ninja Turtles II: The Secret of the Ooze - Face Operation of Michelangelo
- The Adventures of Pinocchio - Lead Puppeteer
- The Bear - Lead Puppeteer
- The Dark Crystal - Part-Time Puppeteer on the Mystics
- The Hitchhiker's Guide to the Galaxy - Puppeteer
- The Hoobs - Creative Consultant
