= Paul Grant (actor) =

British actor (1967–2023)

- Born: 3 February 1967; Peterborough, Cambridgeshire, England
- Died: 20 March 2023 (aged 56) (Note: He was declared brain dead on 16 March 2023 and was pronounced dead on 19 March 2023.); London, England
- Occupation(s): Actor, stuntman
- Years active: 1983-1988; 2001
- Height: 1.32 m (4 ft 4 in)
- Children: 3

Paul Grant (3 February 1967 – 20 March 2023) was a British actor and stuntman.

== Career ==
Grant's career started at age 16, in 1983, when he played an Ewok in Return of the Jedi. Due to Dwarfism, Grant's adult height was 4ft 4in (1.32m). In Labyrinth, he played a member of the Goblin Corps and was a stunt double for the actor portraying the character Hoggle. As a stunt double, Grant appeared in Legend and Willow. After a few minor roles in the 1980s, Grant stopped acting, but briefly came back to the film industry in 2001, when he had an uncredited role as a goblin in Harry Potter and the Philosopher's Stone.

== Death ==
Prior to his death, Grant revealed that he had struggled with drug and alcohol problems.

Grant collapsed outside St Pancras railway station in London, England on 16 March 2023 and was taken to a hospital. He was pronounced dead on 20 March 2023, but had been declared brain dead four days prior. He was 56. He was survived by his girlfriend, two daughters, a son, stepchildren, and grandchildren.

== Filmography ==
Title	Role	Year
Return of the Jedi	Ewok	1983
Legend	stunt double	1985
Labyrinth	Goblin corps/stunt double	1986
The Dead	1st young gentleman	1987
Willow	stunt double	1988
Harry Potter and the Philosopher's Stone	Goblin	2001
