= Alichino =

Japanese manga series

- First wideban volume cover
- Genre: Gothic fantasy
- Manga
- Written by: Kouyu Shurei
- Published by: Home-sha/Shueisha
- English publisher: AUS: Madman Entertainment; NA: Tokyopop
- Magazine: Comic Eyes
- Original run: October 1997 – October 2001
- Volumes: 3
- icon

Alichino is a Japanese manga series written and illustrated by Kouyu Shurei, originally published by Home-sha Inc. and Shueisha. It was translated and distributed by Tokyopop in North America and the United Kingdom; the Tokyopop version of the manga is out of print.

Alichino are beautiful demons that offer wishes to those who are desperate to receive them. However, the price is one's soul. To keep the balance 'kusabi' are born in order to kill Alichino and save humanity. But if the kusabi kills the Alichino, then no wishes will be granted. The question is: does humanity want to be saved?

Alichino is also the name of a demon in Dante Alighieri's Inferno, a guardian of Malebolge. The name derives from Arlecchino, the harlequin.

== Plot ==
The story focuses on Tsugiri, a sorrowful Kusabi. Although he was born to slay the Alichino, he is set back by his miserable past. As a child, he was feared and hated by the townspeople because the Alichino were so attracted to him that they seduced and killed many people to lure him out. One horrible day, his mother was murdered and he was beaten almost to death. Fortunately, he was saved, but his memory of his childhood was hidden away.

Now as a young man, Tsugiri must fight the Alichino and try to save the fragile hearts of those around him. Eventually it is revealed that Tsugiri is the "Bond"; a mysterious being with an incredibly pure soul, making him practically irresistible to Alichino. His guardian, Enju, is kidnapped because of this, forcing Tsugiri and Ryoko to go on a quest to save him. Along the way, some of the mysteries of Ryoko and Myobi's relationship are revealed, as well as Ryoko's connection with Enju's kidnapper, Matsulika.

== Characters ==
Tsugiri
A pretty, silver haired adolescent who has the power to kill Alichinos. His mother and his entire town were murdered. He was saved by Hyura, and was placed in Ryoko and Myoubi's care.
Hyura
A mysterious young man who protected Tsugiri from the Alichino several times. He vanished after the attack.
Enju
A kind and priestly man who raised Tsugiri after the attack. He also allows Myobi to live with him. He is wise and selfless, knowing the secrets behind the kusabi and the Alichino; and still allowing both to reside in his house.
Myobi
Her name literally means "beautiful darkness". A white haired, red-eyed Alichino who protects Tsugiri. She is in love with Ryoko. She and Ryoko saved Tsugiri when he was a child. She does not act like other Alichino and loves to fight them. Although she cares for Tsugiri, she hates to act like it or for him to touch her. Enju, Tsugiri and Ryoko are her favorite people.
Ryoko
A man with great power who Myoubi calls "master." He and Myoubi rescued Tsugiri from a near-death incident ten years ago.
Yui
A male Alichino and the ruler of an entire city. He is a different and unique Alichino who lets his human targets live and worship him instead of eating their souls.
Matsulika
A female Alichino who kidnaps Enju. She is working under the enigmatic Roushohki. She and Ryoko share a dark past.

== Publication ==
Written and illustrated by Kouyu Shurei, Alichino was serialized in Home-sha's shōjo manga magazine Comic Eyes from October 1997 to October 2001, when the magazine ceased its publication; the manga remains unfinished. Shueisha collected its chapters in three wideban volumes, released from November 25, 1998, to May 25, 2001.

The manga was licensed for English release in North America by Tokyopop, who released the three volumes from February 8, 2005, to September 13, 2005. The Tokyopop version of the manga is out of print.

=== Volumes ===
No.	Original release date	Original ISBN	English release date	English ISBN
1	November 25, 1998	4-8342-6101-8	February 8, 2005	978-1-59532-478-8
01. "Alichino"; 02. "Death"; 03. "Sacrifice"; 04. "The Power of "Kusabi""; 05. "Awakening"
2	February 25, 2000	4-8342-6128-X	June 7, 2005	978-1-59532-479-5
06. "Determination"; 07. "Key"; 08. "Journey"; 09. "Angel of the Moon"; 10. "Charisma"; 11. "Existence"
3	May 25, 2001	4-8342-6150-6	September 13, 2005	978-1-59532-480-1
12. "Rennion"; 13. "Flower of Blood"; 14. "Unification"; 15. "Night of Illusion"; 16. "Taboo"; 17. "Sacrament"
