= A. C. H. Smith =

British novelist and playwright

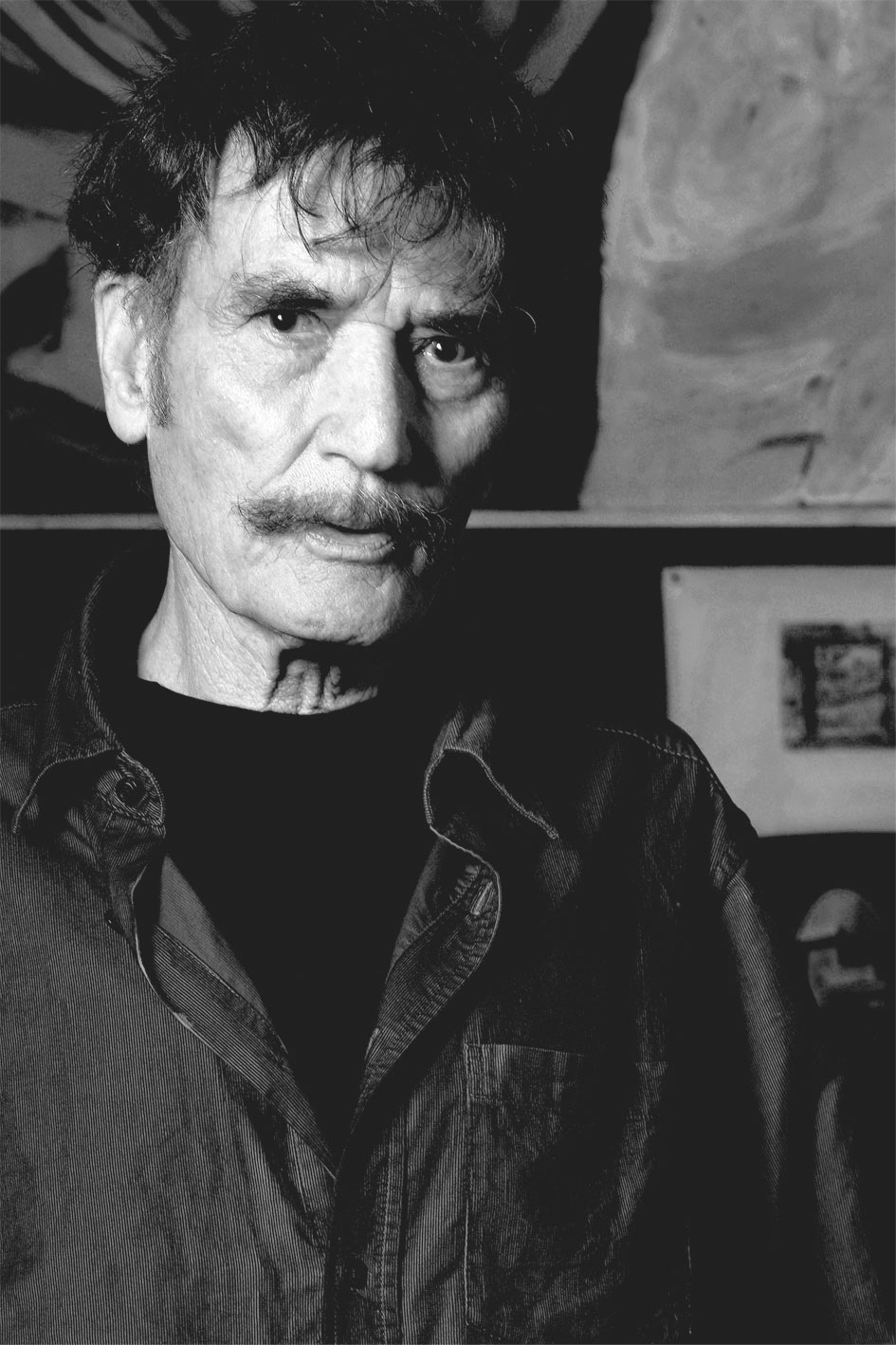
- A C H Smith (portrait by Stephen Morris)
- Born: Anthony Charles Smith; 31 October 1935 (age 90); Kew, United Kingdom
- Education: Corpus Christi College, Cambridge
- Occupations: Novelist, playwright

Anthony Charles Hockley Smith (born Anthony Charles Smith, 31 October 1935) is a British novelist and playwright from Kew.

== Early life and career ==
Smith was educated at Hampton Grammar School and Corpus Christi College, Cambridge, where he read Modern Languages. On starting his writing career, to distinguish himself from other writers of the same name he added the initial "H", representing his grandmother's maiden name, Hockley.

Since 1960 his home has been in Bristol. From 1965 to 1969 he was Senior Research Associate at Richard Hoggart's Centre for Contemporary Cultural Studies at Birmingham University, and he has held visiting posts at the Universities of Bristol, Bournemouth, and Texas (Austin). From 1964 to 1973 he did literary work for the Royal Shakespeare Company, and later some for the National Theatre.

In 1971, Peter Brook invited him to Iran for three months to write a book about the Orghast project that Brook and Ted Hughes were undertaking. He was a director of the Cheltenham Literature Festival in 1978, 1979, and 1999. He has two daughters, Imogen and Sophie, and a son, Oliver Smith.

== Bibliography ==
=== Novels ===
- The Crowd (1965) ASIN: B0006BWG2S
- Zero Summer (1971) ISBN 0-413-44630-1
- Treatment (1976) ISBN 0-297-77073-X
- Sebastian the Navigator (1985) ISBN 0-297-78722-5
- The Dangerous Memoir of Citizen Sade (2000) ISBN 1-85135-033-0

=== Thrillers ===
- The Jericho Gun (1977) ISBN 0-297-77415-8
- Extra Cover (1981) ISBN 0-297-77924-9

=== Novelisations ===
- Edward & Mrs. Simpson (British TV series) (1978) ISBN 0-297-77516-2
- The Dark Crystal (movie) (1982) ISBN 0-03-062436-3
- Wagner (movie) (in German and Italian, 1983) ISBN 3-453-01837-0. English-language edition (2012) ISBN 978-1-85135-035-3.
- Lady Jane (movie) (1985) ISBN 0-03-006168-7
- Labyrinth (movie) (1986) ISBN 0-03-007322-7

=== Non-fiction ===
- Orghast at Persepolis: An account of the experiment in theatre directed by Peter Brook and written by Ted Hughes (1972) ISBN 0-413-28830-7 and (1973) ISBN 0-670-52835-8
- Paper voices: The popular press and social change, 1935–1965 (with Elizabeth Immirzi and Trevor Blackwell) (1975) ISBN 0-7011-2062-2
- Dickens of London (biography, ghosted for Wolf Mankowitz) (1976) ISBN 0-297-77159-0
- Poems, selected with a foreword by Tom Stoppard (2009) ISBN 978-0-9560222-3-3
- WordSmith, a memoir (2012) ISBN 978-1-908326-20-1

Stories and poems for BBC radio, Transatlantic Review, The Listener, etc.

=== Selected plays ===
- Albert's Bridge Extended (co-written with Tom Stoppard), Edinburgh Festival (1978)
- Master of Letters, The Playwrights Company at the New Vic, Bristol (1979)
- God's Wonderful Railway, Bristol Old Vic (1985)
- Pericles (reconstruction of Shakespeare's), Theater Emory, Atlanta (1987); Show of Strength Theatre Company, Bristol (1990)
- Up The Feeder, Down The Mouth, Bristol Old Vic (1997, 2001). Text published 2001 ISBN 1-85135-040-3; illustrated edition, 2012, ISBN 978-1-908326-12-6
- Albert’s Bridge – the Musical (composer David Lyon), Shaftesbury Community Theatre (1999)
- The Redcliffe Hermit, Head Heart + 2 Fingers, Bristol (2005). Text published 2005, ISBN 1-85135-060-8
- Doctor Love (Molière-based musical, composer David Lyon, Tobacco Factory, Bristol (2008)
- Walking The Chains, The Passenger Shed, Bristol (2015)

=== TV and cinema ===
With his wife, Smith was the subject of John Boorman's six-part BBC docudrama The Newcomers (1964). He wrote and presented about 200 arts programmes and documentaries for HTV and BBC. Six of his plays have been televised. Three of his screenplays have been published.

=== Editing and journalism ===
- At Cambridge, he edited the literary magazine delta and was Arts Editor of Varsity, the student newspaper. He was co-editor of Universities' Poetry (anthologies). With Tom Stoppard, Smith edited an Arts Page in the Western Daily Press in 1960–1963. He has also reported cricket for The Times, reviewed theatre for The Guardian, and written features for The Observer, The Sunday Times, Telegraph Magazine, New Society, The Listener, and the London Magazine.
- He contributed an essay, "The Art of Friendship", to Derek Balmer: A Singular Vision (Sansom & Co, 2012).
