= Kouyu Shurei =

Japanese artist

- Occupations: Illustrator, manga artist

Kouyu Shurei (珠黎皐夕, Shurei Kōyu) is a Japanese artist whose career includes illustrations for several series of novels, as well as creating doujinshi with the Shi no Tenshi circle.

She was awarded the Cobalt Illustrator's Award in 1995. As a manga artist, Shurei's work, Alichino has gathered a considerable fanbase and critical acclaim, which is quite a feat for an artist's debut. She is the illustrator of the covers to the Return to Labyrinth manga series.
