= I Had a Little Nut Tree =

Nursery rhyme

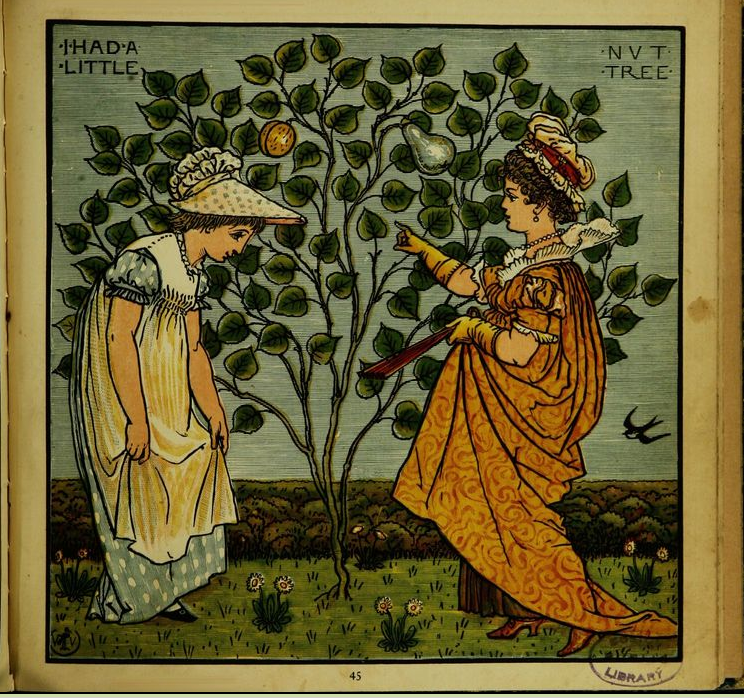

Nursery rhyme
- Published: 1797
- Songwriter(s): Traditional

'I Had a Little Nut Tree' is an English language nursery rhyme. It has a Roud Folk Song Index number of 3749. The song mentions a visit by the daughter of the King of Spain to request nutmeg and a pear. James Orchard Halliwell suggested that the song commemorates the 1506 visit of the Queen regnant Joanna of Castile to the English court of her brother-in-law, Henry VII. However, the oldest known version of the song dates to 1797.

== Lyrics ==
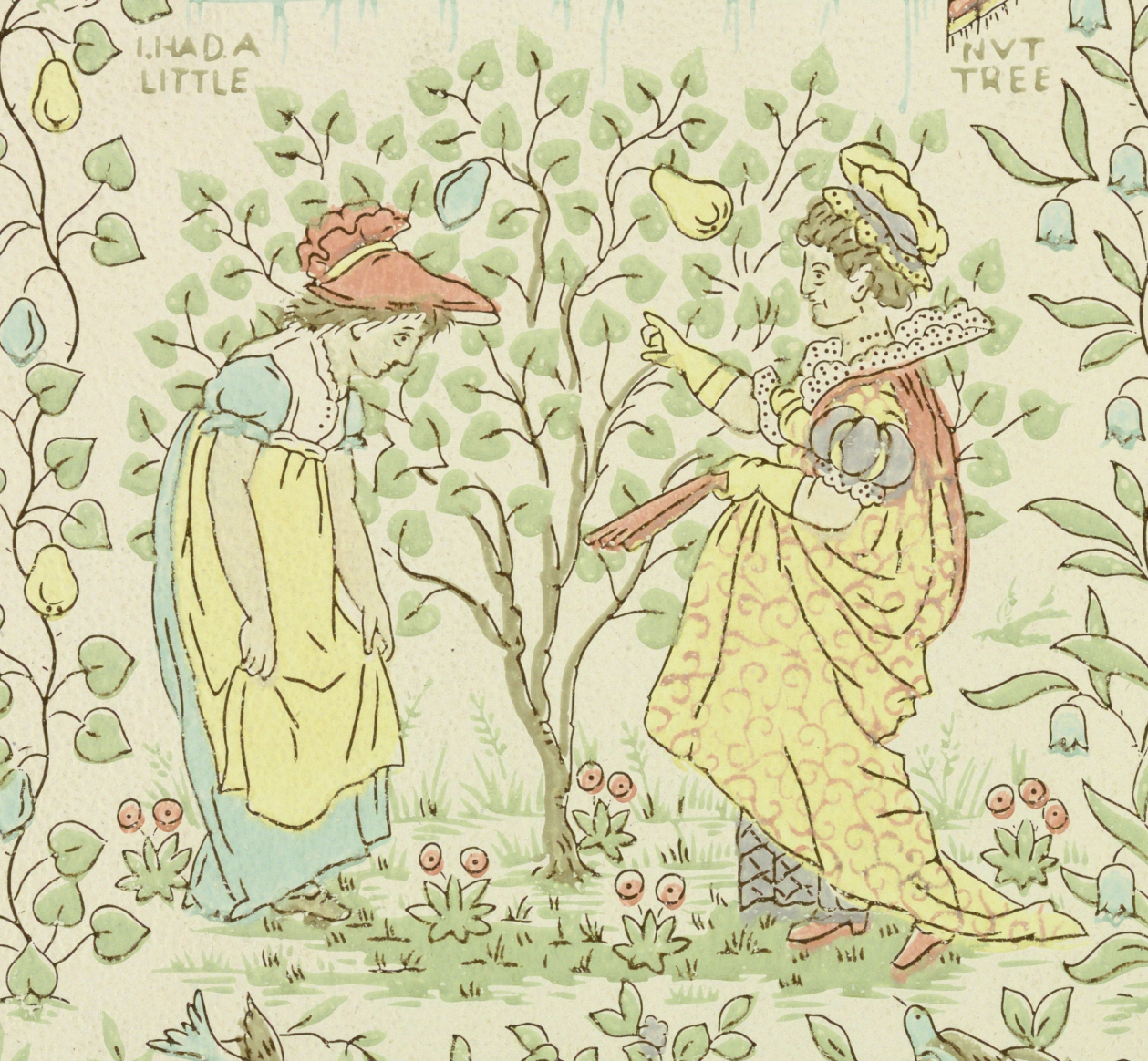
Late 19th century illustration

I had a little nut tree,
Nothing would it bear,
But a silver nutmeg
And a golden pear.

The King of Spain's daughter
Came to visit me,
And all for the sake
Of my little nut tree.

Her dress was made of crimson,
Jet black was her hair,
She asked me for my nutmeg
And my golden pear.

I said, "So fair a princess
Never did I see,
I'll give you all the fruit
From my little nut tree."

Alternative verse:

I skipped over water,
I danced over sea,
And all the birds in the air
Couldn't catch me.

== Origins and meaning ==
The first recorded instance of the rhyme is in Newest Christmas Box, printed in London in 1797. James Orchard Halliwell suggested that it was much older and commemorated Juana of Castile who visited the court of Henry VII in 1506, but did not provide any additional evidence to support the theory.
