= Two Little Dickie Birds =

Nursery rhyme

Nursery rhyme
- Published: c. 1765

"Two Little Dickie Birds" or "Two Little Black Birds" is an English language nursery rhyme and fingerplay. It has a Roud Folk Song Index number of 16401.

== Lyrics ==
Modern versions of the rhyme include:

Two little dickie birds sitting on a wall.
One named Peter, one named Paul.
Fly away, Peter! Fly away, Paul!
Come back, Peter! Come back, Paul!

== Origins ==
The rhyme was first recorded when published in Mother Goose's Melody in London around 1765. In this version the names of the birds were Jack and Gill:

There were two blackbirds

Sat upon a hill,

The one was nam'd Jack,

The other nam'd Gill;

Fly away Jack,

Fly away Gill,

Come again Jack,

Come again Gill.

This is accompanied by the maxim "a bird in the hand is worth two in the bush".

These names seem to have been replaced with the apostles Peter and Paul in the 19th century.

== Variants ==
In American English, the variant "Two Little Blackbirds" is more common.

Two little blackbirds sitting on a hill.
One named Jack and one named Jill.
Fly away Jack, fly away Jill.
Come back Jack, come back Jill.

Two little blackbirds flying in the sky.
One named Low and one named High.
Fly away Low, fly away High.
Come back Low, come back High.

Two little blackbirds sitting on a pole.
One named Fast and one named Slow.
Fly away Fast, fly away Slow.
Come back Fast, come back Slow.

Two little blackbirds sitting on a gate.
One named Early and one named Late.
Fly away Early, fly away Late.
Come back Early, come back Late.

== Hand actions ==
The adult, out of sight of the child, will mark in some conspicuous way the nail of the index finger of one hand and the nail of the second finger of the other hand. Both hands are then shown to the child as fists (folded fingers downwards) with the two fingers with marked nails pointing forward – these represent Peter and Paul. As the rhyme is recited, the hand actions are:

Line	Action
Two little dickie birds sitting on a wall	Both of the exposed, marked, fingers are wiggled to attract attention
One named Peter	Wiggle one marked finger, Peter, to attract attention
One named Paul	Wiggle other marked finger, Paul, to attract attention
Fly away Peter	The Peter hand is quickly drawn back alongside the adult's head. As part of the movement the adult folds the marked finger and sticks out the second finger of the same hand and drops the hand back down to the original position. The child sees that the marking, Peter, is no longer there – it has flown away
Fly away Paul	The action is repeated with the other hand
Come Back Peter	The action is reversed to make Peter reappear
Come Back Paul	The action is reversed to make Paul reappear
