= Toby Philpott =

English puppeteer

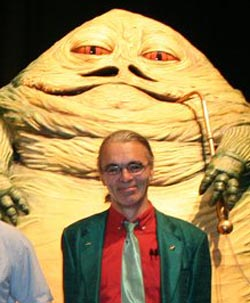
- Born: 14 February 1946 (age 80); London, England
- Occupations: Clown, juggler, library technician, puppeteer, teacher, street performer
- Known for: The Dark Crystal, Return of the Jedi, The Company of Wolves, Labyrinth, Little Shop of Horrors, Who Framed Roger Rabbit
- Website: Toby Philpott's Home Page

Toby Philpott (born 14 February 1946) is an English puppeteer best known for his work in motion picture animatronics during the 1980s in such films as The Dark Crystal and Return of the Jedi. Born into a family of entertainers, Philpott dropped out of school and travelled the world during the 1960s, squatting in various locations and surviving off money he earned from his work as a street performer, which included juggling, fire eating, magic shows, clowning and acrobatics. He began his film career after Jim Henson personally selected Philpott to work on the 1982 fantasy film The Dark Crystal, in which he worked side-by-side with Henson.

The next year, Philpott was approached to serve as one of the puppeteers controlling Jabba the Hutt in Return of the Jedi. Philpott controlled the left arm, head, tongue and body of the giant Hutt puppet. Philpott would lend his puppetry skills to other such movies as The Company of Wolves (1984), Labyrinth (1986), Little Shop of Horrors (1986) and Who Framed Roger Rabbit (1988) before leaving the film industry. Reflecting upon his movie career, Philpott describes himself as practically a "street juggler that got lucky".

== Biography ==
=== Early life ===
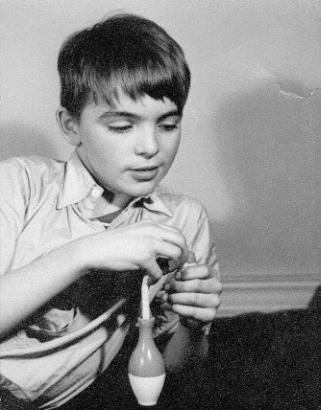
Toby Philpott during his childhood

Toby Philpott was born 14 February 1946 in London, England into a family of performers and teachers. His father, A. R. Philpott, also known as "Pantopuck the Puppet Man," was a well-known puppeteer who would go on to become a writer and teacher on the subject of puppets. Toby's mother, Sheila Moriarty, was a singer and actress who taught voice lessons and Shakespearian verse speaking. At an early age, Toby Philpott discovered an interest in the performing arts and a particular love for magic. He also developed an interest in puppetry in part by reading a diary his father kept about using puppets throughout the Great Depression of the 1930s. Nevertheless, his parents did not encourage him to pursue a career in show business.

In the 1960s, Philpott became swept up in the youth movement that rose with the end of the British Empire. Philpott had a rebellious attitude when it came to such matters as money and capitalism. Philpott dropped out of school and began to travel the world, living what he would later describe as a "Bohemian" and "gypsy" lifestyle. By his late teens, he was splitting his time between archaeological jobs and various odd jobs at fairgrounds; he began the latter working an octopus ride for one season at a fair in Yorkshire. By 1967, at age 21, he was living mostly on other people's floors and sofas in Notting Hill Gate in the Royal Borough of Kensington and Chelsea; with no permanent residence, Philpott survived by juggling for meals and money on the streets.

=== Discovering the performing arts ===
Throughout the late-1960s, he worked counter jobs at several nightclubs in Soho, including Bunjies and Les Cousins, where he met many musicians and other performers and formed what he described as some of "my most treasured memories." He also continued working in occasional archeological digs, including mining activities in 1968 in the wells of Sandal Castle, a historic ruin in Wakefield, West Yorkshire. In 1970, he lived in Paris, France, where he sold jewellery in the streets and squatted in an atelier on the Rue d'Alésia with a woman named Nelly Gareau. He spent two years visiting various locations in the United States of America and Mexico with Gareau.

Philpott returned to London in 1972 and gate-crashed a Le Grand Magic Circus show on New Year's Eve at the famed Roundhouse arts venue. Philpott was invited onto the stage during the show, and his childhood interest for the performing arts was reignited. Philpott tried to join Le Grand Magic Circus in Paris and participated in one show, but was not picked up for continued employment. He returned to the United Kingdom determined to perform for a living and, while juggling outside London's Oval House Theatre, was discovered by John and Crissie Trigger, who ran a traveling entertainment company called The Raree Show.

=== Traveling street performer ===
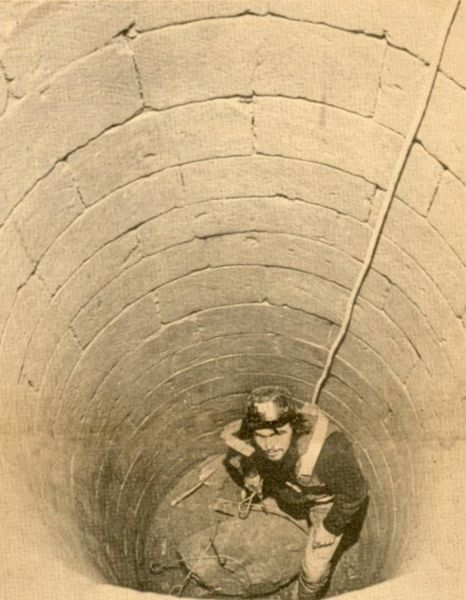
Toby Philpott in 1968, during a mining job at Sandal Castle in Wakefield, West Yorkshire.

Philpott spent the next several years traveling and performing in both Raree and solo gigs, in such places as Liverpool, Sweden, Germany, Mexico and the United States. His acts included juggling, magic, fire eating, acrobatics, unicycling, fireworks, clowning, and slapstick comedy in such venues as schools, theatres, Medieval festivals, street markets and children's television. He also ran theatre workshops for children and learned how to play various musical instruments and apply stage make-up.

Philpott spent the mid-1970s living in the London shed of Australian Chris Löfvén and Lyne Helms, who at the time were working on the 1976 film Oz: A Rock 'n' Roll Road Movie. He continued traveling all over Europe as a street performer, where he used hand-made props and performed self-invented tricks. He performed in opening acts at such venues as the Royal Opera House in London's Covent Garden. Philpott also performed in various fringe theatre groups, including the Red Buddha Theatre with Japanese musician Stomu Yamashta, and Incubus with Richard LeParmentier, who would go on to play Admiral Motti in A New Hope. He also learned stage management and other "techie stuff" at the Melkweg music venue and cultural center in Amsterdam. Philpott said he particularly enjoyed seeing "how things were done."

=== Start of animatronics career ===
The death of Toby Philpott's father in 1978 moved Philpott to get away from solo performing and enter a more collaborative medium. Philpott's first foray into motion pictures was when he and other students in a mime class were selected to play neanderthals in the 1981 film, Quest for Fire. He was dropped from the film when the project changed producers, but the experience opened Philpott to the possibility of entering into a new entertainment medium. That year his mime teacher and movement coach, Desmond Jones, informed him about an audition advertisement for acrobats, mimes and dancers for The Dark Crystal, a 1982 fantasy film directed by Jim Henson and Frank Oz, the puppeteer behind Yoda in 1980's The Empire Strikes Back. The Dark Crystal included groundbreaking animatronics, the use of electronics and robotics in mechanized puppets to make them appear alive. The ad called for a variety of performer types because it was unknown what kind of physical abilities and stamina would be necessary for this relatively new artform.

Philpott saw the film as a chance to apply his performing arts skills into a "new and exciting field" and, since the audition involved a workshop, he felt he could learn something from the experience even if he did not get a job. He answered the call and was selected from about 200 letter applications. Philpott participated in the initial audition workshop, which provided instruction on basic puppetry skills and improvisation techniques, and was among the 50 who were called back for additional workshops, where the pool of finalists was narrowed down to 20. Philpott described the final round of workshops as extremely competitive, but he was among the final 10 chosen to work on the film. Henson, who Philpott described as "the nicest millionaire I ever met," had a hands-on role in the selection process. Philpott was supposed to be among four that would start work immediately, but after suffering back problems due to the amount of running in the workshops, Philpott had to remain with the second team of six who worked on the film during the spring of 1982. Prior to filming, Philpott received lessons in lip-synch and was provided assorted types of puppets to experiment with.

=== The Dark Crystal ===
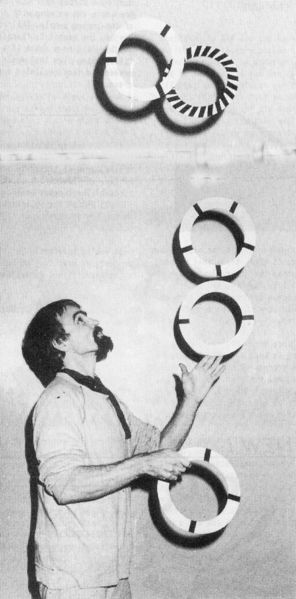
Toby Philpott juggling.

Development work took place at Jim Henson's Creature Shop, which at the time was located in a former-post office across the street from Henson's house on Downshire Hill in Hampstead, London. Toby Philpott began training in bodywork and puppeteering, and worked with the early incarnations of the character puppets, which began to become fine-tuned around the specific puppeteers. Each of the main puppet performers were allocated into crews to work the eyes, eyebrows and arms of specific puppets. Jim Henson personally chose Philpott and fellow puppeteer Robbie Barnett to work in his support crew, which Philpott attributed to a combination of talent and temperament, since each crew would be working very close together. Philpott often played the right arm of the characters Henson animated.

Filming took place at Elstree Studios. Although most of the puppet crews were able to do additional rehearsals while Henson worked the other various aspects of film production, Philpott and Barnett were often given just a quick walk-through before the actual performance due to Henson's busy work schedule. The teams concentrated their efforts through the puppet to create a coherent set of gestures and an individual performance and personality, which involved a great deal of experimentation, discussion and feedback through video playback among the team. Philpott said whenever he made a mistake due to lack of expressiveness or timing in his gestures, Henson remained very patient and never raised his voice or became angry.

The main character Philpott played in The Dark Crystal was urTih the Alchemist, one of the urRu; Philpott later described him as the favorite character he ever puppeteered. But he also played various other characters and races in the film, including the Garthim, Pod People and other swamp creatures. Philpott said the puppet designs alone gave the creatures a great deal of characters, which helped him prepare for the roles. He found an inner peace and deep patience while wearing the tall, luminescent Mystic suits; similarly, the suits for the hulking crustacean-like Garthims made Philpott and the other actors feel "wired up and raring to go." Philpott and the other puppeteers depended on direct, honest feedback from each other and the filmmakers, since it was difficult to know the impression they made while wearing the suits.

Philpott's most disappointing moment during The Dark Crystal came during the first day of shooting, when he played a mystic who was featured in the foreground of a scene in the Mystic Valley. The costume's jaw had recently been readjusted and its mouth was stuck hanging open in an unflattering way, but none of the crew notified Philpott and he was unhappy with how it came out in the movie. Nevertheless, Philpott said the puppeteers and filmmakers were a "very happy and engaged crew" and because the techniques and methods were so new during The Dark Crystal, he enjoyed a level of hands-on involvement that would not be matched in his future movies.

=== Return of the Jedi ===
While working on The Dark Crystal at the Creature Shop, rumors began to circulate that alien characters for Return of the Jedi were being developed at that same studio, and several of the puppeteers began looking for ways to get a job on the film. David Barclay, who had been a puppet builder for The Dark Crystal, was chosen as one of the operators of the massive Jabba the Hutt puppet, and asked for Toby Philpott to be hired as his partner. Philpott, who was unaware of Barclay's politicking on his behalf, was surprised by the sudden job offer, and eagerly accepted it.

Barclay was the chief Jabba puppeteer who planned all the movements and guided all the other performers; Philpott controlled Jabba's left arm, with which he controlled many of Jabba's more active motions, including eating frogs, smoking the Hookah pipe and assaulting Bib Fortuna and C-3PO. Philpott also used his right hand to control Jabba's tongue and animate his head, and controlled the body by swiveling his seat with his leg braces. Cable controls allowed Philpott to swivel the head and snarl Jabba's Mouth.

The rest of the puppet team included Barclay on the right arm and mouth; Mike Edmonds on the tail; and John Coppinger, who controlled the eyes via remote control and gave the others feedback based on what he saw from the outside. Philpott would later describe sitting inside the Jabba puppet with Barclay as being "like a two-man submarine" because it was very hot, cramped and uncomfortable. A monitor inside the puppet shows a general shot of Jabba that helped the puppeteers operate, although they could not tell where the frame of the shot was from the image; the team depended on feedback amongst themselves, and their training under Jim Henson gave them experience in coordinating to create a single creature.

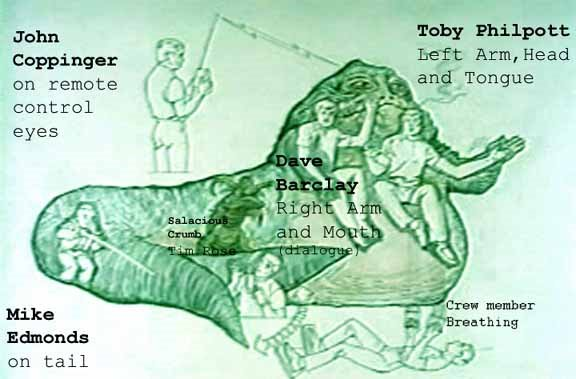
A blueprint of the Jabba the Hutt puppet from Return of the Jedi.

Philpott and Barclay would go inside the puppet early in the day and remain there for almost the entire nine-and-a-half hours of filming each day, so much so that other cast and crew members did not know who they were during breaks. The two would only occasionally leave the suit to discuss Jabba-related business, but preferred to remain in character within the suit. Philpott and Barclay employed an approach by Jim Henson in which they took direction while in character; director Richard Marquand agreed to give Jabba direction as if the character was the actor, and they talked back to the director as if the puppet itself were a live performer.

It took about three weeks to film the Jabba's Palace scenes, and an additional week to film the Sail Barge scenes; Philpott and the puppeteers said they experienced few problems operating Jabba due to the effective design work of Phil Tippett, Stuart Freeborn and John Coppinger. Philpott's previous experience with The Dark Crystal helped prepare Philpott for the role of Jabba, although as a result, he later said he wasn't as "overawed" by the experience as he might have been. Nevertheless, he described the experience as "great fun" and said he enjoyed being the center of attention among the many other puppets and live actors in Jabba's Palace.

During the scene when Princess Leia is presented to Jabba after freeing Han Solo from the carbonite, Marquand told Philpott to try to get Jabba to really lick the side of Carrie Fisher's face in order to create a genuine disgusted reaction. Philpott resisted at first since the tongue, which was covered in K-Y Jelly, was difficult to control, but Marquand convinced him to do it. During the scene in which he made the attempt, Philpott accidentally stuck the tongue into Fisher's ear, which caused a commotion on the set, although Philpott was unaware of what had happened until he emerged from the costume.

The brief scene in which Jabba eats the frogs took several takes to get correctly since it was difficult for Philpott to reach Jabba's mouth with the left arm; the filmmakers originally tried to use an actual frog but it kept escaping and hopping around the set. The final scene Philpott filmed was the death of Jabba the Hutt; he and the other puppeteers "trashed around and went crazy" and Philpott said once Carrie Fisher realized she couldn't hurt the performers inside Jabba, "she really went for it." Philpott described actor Harrison Ford as "rueful, and funny as he appeared;" actress Carrie Fisher as mischievous on the set and petulant due to being stuck in a long contract; and actor Mark Hamill was "a bit insecure" and not nearly as boyish as he seemed on-screen. Like most bit players in the original Star Wars trilogy, Philpott was bought out of his contract in 1983, the year Return of the Jedi was released, and thus receives no future royalties for his participation in the film.

=== Labyrinth ===
Toby Philpott served as president of the International Jugglers' Association from 1982 to 1983, and also did animatronic work for the 1984 film, The Company of Wolves. By 1985, Philpott was out of work and in desperate need of money while living in Cardiff, the capital of Wales. On an impulse, he called The Jim Henson Company to inquire about work. Although he had already missed the audition for the new movie Jim Henson was developing, Labyrinth, Philpott was immediately called in for a job.

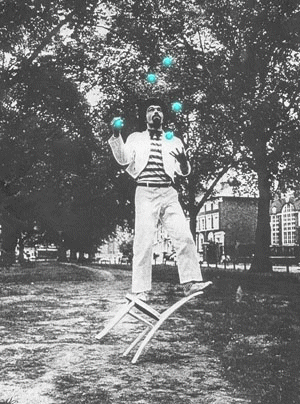
Toby Philpott juggling.

Philpott operated several characters, including a goblin puppet that sat at the foot of the throne of Jareth the Goblin King, who was played by David Bowie. He also played one of the Fireys, the wild goblins that live in the forest and have detachable body parts that come apart; Philpott, who was credited as playing "Firey No. 1," controlled the various body parts along with puppeteers Kevin Clash and, once again, David Barclay. He also controlled the eyes of the Junk Lady character (played by Fraggle Rock performer Karen Prell) and was one of the many sets of hands among the Helping Hands, hand-shaped goblins that protruded from the walls of Jareth's castle and acted with the other hands to create talking face-formations.

Philpott said his fondest memory during the production of Labyrinth was taking his six-year-old son, Keili, on a tour of the set of the Goblin Village. Philpott did not enjoy his time working on Labyrinth due to a back injury he suffered while playing soccer in Somerset prior to getting the job. The strain puppeteering places on the back left Philpott in agony while working on the set, and he made several unsuccessful attempts to heal himself through osteopathy and acupuncture. His back problem was solved when a friend recommended a clinic on Harley Street in the City of Westminster in London. The therapy proved so effective, Philpott was able to walk up a mountain in Spain to organize a juggling convention after filming on Labyrinth wrapped.

=== Little Shop of Horrors ===
Toby Philpott was called to work on the 1986 Frank Oz film Little Shop of Horrors, where he was among a team of people who operated the animatronic plant that, in the film, feeds on human blood. The limbs were operated by gimbals and Philpott controlled the right-hand leaf of the plant, which he has described as "quite heavy work." Philpott was also an understudy to the puppeteers who operated the plant's lips. The plant increased in size throughout the movie and, at its largest incarnation, Philpott controlled one of the tentacles. However, that sequence was cut from the theatrical release when audiences responded negatively to the ending, in which the plant ate all the major characters and destroyed the city. The filmmakers created a new, more upbeat ending, and Philpott was out of town and unavailable for the plant's new scenes.

=== Leaving the film industry ===
Toby Philpott auditioned before Brian Henson, the son of Jim Henson, for a part in Return to Oz, the 1985 semi-sequel to the 1939 classic, The Wizard of Oz. Philpott was on the short list for the film but, for reasons unknown to him and to his great disappointment, was not offered the job. Philpott's film career for the most part ended in the late-1980s, which he attributed to a number of reasons, including changes in the film industry that were making animatronics more and more obsolete, and Prime Minister Margaret Thatcher's decision not to give tax breaks to films, which drove foreign film productions away from the United Kingdom. He also felt the death of Jim Henson in 1990 resulted in a younger staff at the Jim Henson Company, which severed the ties of Philpott and other long-standing puppeteers.

Philpott, who went into what he called "a bit of a downward spiral" during this point of his life, was working in a circus school and holding juggling workshops when he met a group of people who eventually started their own traveling circus company in 1986, called the Nofit State Circus. Philpott left the school to go on the road with NoFit, at first working as part of the big top tent crew, and he found that erecting and disassembling the tent drew crowds by itself. He eventually became a stage manager and also performed with the circus, traveling with them for several summer tours throughout the United Kingdom until the mid-1990s.

=== Who Framed Roger Rabbit ===
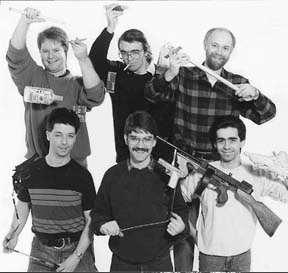
Toby Philpott (back, middle) with the other Who Framed Roger Rabbit puppeteers, including Star Wars alums David Barclay (front, middle) and Mike Quinn (front, right).

Toby Philpott made a brief return to the movies to participate in the 1988 film, Who Framed Roger Rabbit, a comedy that combined live-action film with animation. David Barclay was tasked with putting together a team of puppeteers to work on the movie and he contacted Philpott, who was living atop of a mountain in Spain at the time. Philpott came on as one of the six puppeteers, who served as a "troubleshooting team" who covered simple puppet duties with live-action objects and other "stuff that the SFX crew couldn't manage, or didn't want to deal with." The other puppeteers on the team were Barclay, Ian Tregonning, Christopher Leith, Geoff Felix and Mike Quinn, who played Nien Nunb and Ree-Yees and controlled the Sy Snootles and Ghoel puppets in Return of the Jedi.

Among Philpott and the puppet crew's duties were using strings to move objects handled by the cartoon characters, such as the various items scuffled around by an octopus bartender or the gun aimed at actor Bob Hoskins by one of the evil weasel characters. Other duties were as simple as wobbling boxes or other surfaces the cartoon characters stood on. During a scene in which Roger Rabbit flushes himself down a toilet, Philpott spent a full afternoon under the fake toilet, where he used an invisible string to pull the toilet flusher and spun around to make water come up from the bowl. Barclay said the experience was enjoyable, but he felt the computer-effects-oriented crew did not take the puppeteers very seriously. He sensed that his animatronic art form was dying and knew he would probably never work in movies again. Philpott did appear, however, as a juggler in the background of the 1989 romantic comedy The Tall Guy, which starred Jeff Goldblum, Emma Thompson, and Rowan Atkinson.

=== Later life ===
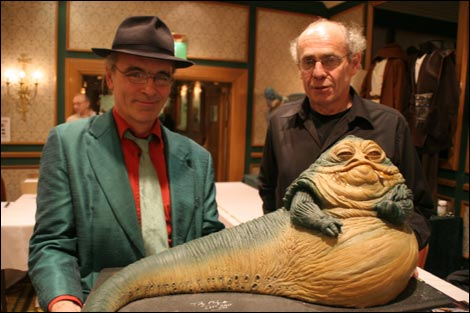
Toby Philpott and John Coppinger, Jabba the Hutt sculptor.

In August 1997, Toby Philpott participated in a public arts performance called The X-Factor: Close Encounters of a Different Kind, which involved various performances scattered throughout a small town outside Cardiff. Philpott played Norman Nesbitt, a geeky man who believes he has been contacted by UFOs. He was placed in a room full of maps, cardboard spaceships and notebooks filled with his own scribblings. Other characters included his girlfriend, who believed his correspondence with aliens was an excuse for breaking up with her, and the "Men in White Coats," who constantly tried to take Norman Nesbitt away but were never successful. Philpott was not paid for the one-day performance, which was completely improvised.

In December 1997, after more than 30 years of self-employment, Toby Philpott took a job at Cardiff Central Library as a library technician, where he provides information technology and other computer support; Philpott described the job as a logical move at that stage in his life and said he realized would be necessary to stay employed in the next century. He said that "Finding Jabba the Hutt working in a library is no more unusual than the rest of my life." Philpott is a member of the board of the NoFit State Circus (although he no longer travels with them) and is a long-term student at the Maybe Logic Academy, an online study group founded by writer Robert Anton Wilson. Philpott remains well known for his animatronics work, particularly on Return of the Jedi, and attends occasional science fiction conventions to meet fans and sign autographs, including Celebration Europe in 2007. Philpott said he had no idea how large the Star Wars fanbase was until he started using the Internet in 1999. Reflecting upon his career in the movies years later, Toby Philpott would describe himself as "a street juggler that got lucky." Philpott has said he has considered writing a book about his life and opinions. In November 2007, Philpott wrote a 50,000-word novel in one month, as part of the National Novel Writing Month creative writing project. The book, Foolproof, is about a group of nomadic young people living in modern Spain.

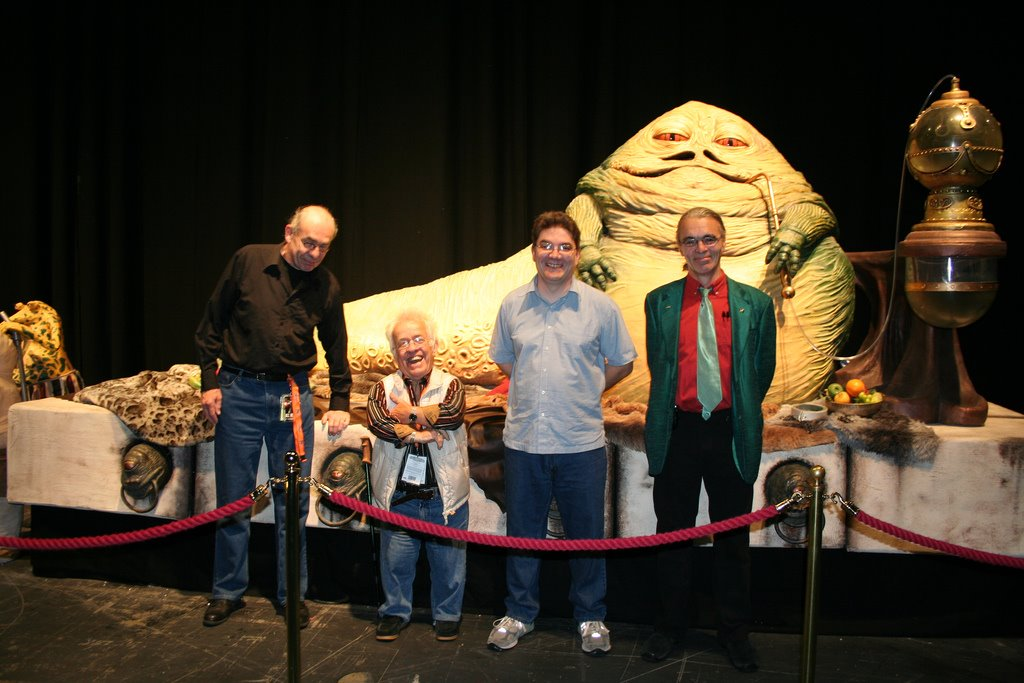
Jabba the Hutt sculptor John Coppinger with Jabba puppeteers Mike Edmonds, David Barclay and Toby Philpott at a Star Wars fan convention.

Following the 1997 Star Wars Special Edition theatrical re-release of A New Hope, Philpott said he did not like the new animated Jabba the Hutt featured in a previously-cut scene and, although he was interested in the future possibilities brought about by computer-generated imagery, he lamented the increased use of computer animations rather than animatronics and real performers. Philpott did not dismiss CGI altogether, especially when it appears seamless and convincing as he believed it did in Steven Spielberg's 1994 film, Jurassic Park. However, he felt puppetry and animatronics often lent a more convincing look to the movies than the "slick hyper-reality" of some computer effects, and feels puppeteers have the unique ability to improvise and interact with the performers, unlike computer-generated images. Philpott would later admit, however, that the animated Jabbas that appeared in the 2004 DVD re-release of Return of the Jedi and the 1999 prequel The Phantom Menace were significant improvements over the special edition incarnation.

Toby Philpott lives with his long-time girlfriend, the artist Julie Shackson, and has a son named Keili Pentaphobe and a daughter named Yo, who gave birth to his granddaughter, Matilda. Philpott's favorite band is The Grateful Dead; his favorite books are The Illuminatus! Trilogy, Catch-22, The Sirens of Titan, The Magus and VALIS; and his favorite writers are Kurt Vonnegut, Robert Anton Wilson, Joseph Heller, Henry Miller and Tom Robbins.

== Filmography ==
Year	Title	Role	Notes
1982	The Dark Crystal	urTih the Alchemist; various roles	Actor and Puppeteer
1983	Return of the Jedi	Jabba the Hutt	Puppeteer
1984	The Company of Wolves		Special effects (animatronic wolf and transformations)
1986	Labyrinth	Firey 1, Helping Hands, Junk Lady (eyes), Goblin	Actor and Puppeteer
1986	Little Shop of Horrors	Audrey II (plant)	Puppeteer
1988	Who Framed Roger Rabbit		Puppeteer
1989	The Tall Guy	Juggler in "Elephant" Chorus	Actor (background)
