= Mike Quinn (puppeteer) =

British puppeteer

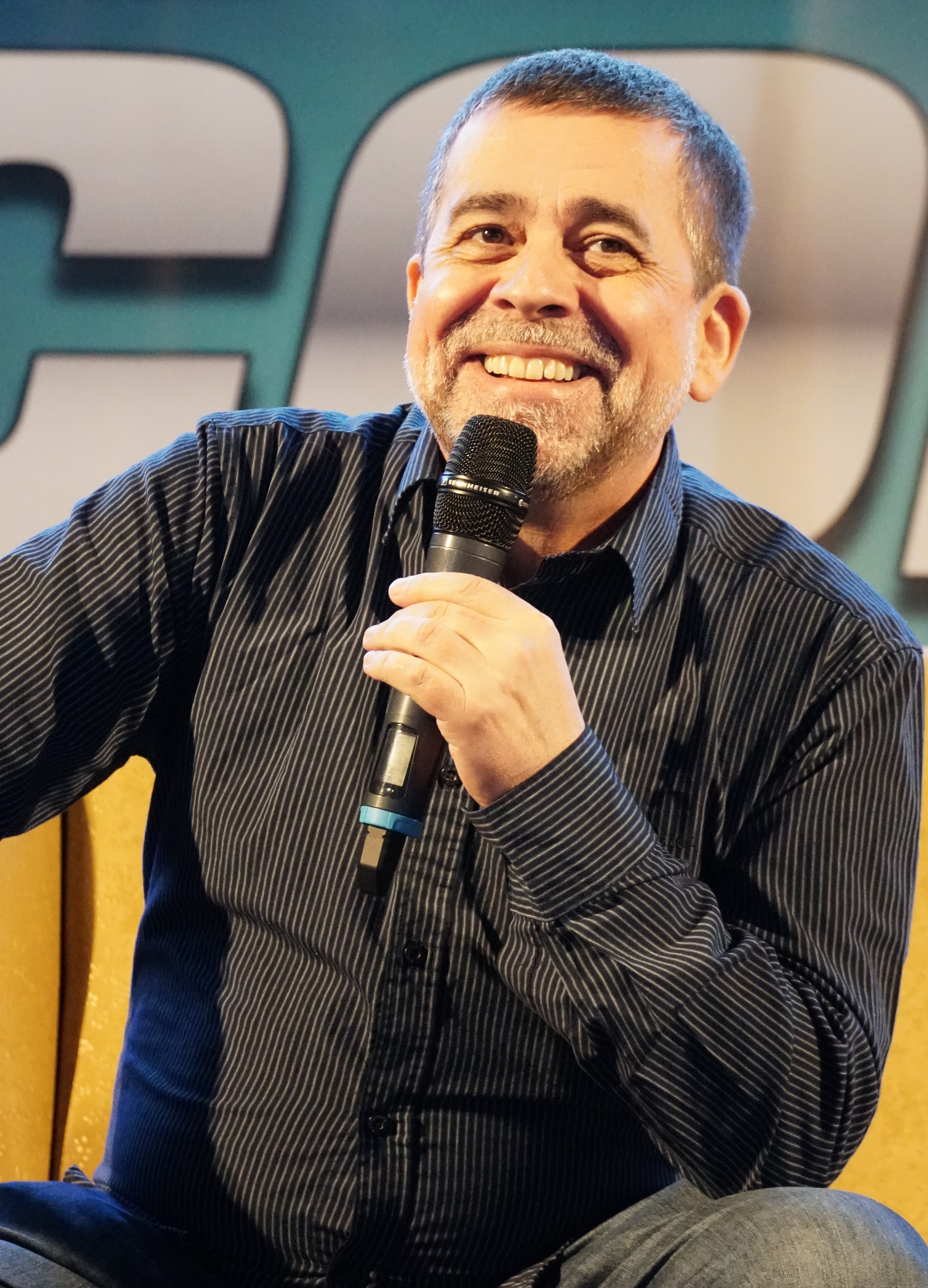
- Quinn in 2022
- Born: 28 July 1964 (age 62); London, England, U.K.
- Other names: Mike Quinby; Michael E. Quinn; Michael Quinn
- Occupations: Puppeteer; animator; actor
- Years active: 1980–present
- Spouse: Karen Prell (m. 1988; div. 2004)

Michael Quinn (born 28 July 1964) is an English puppeteer, animator and actor.

== Early life and career ==
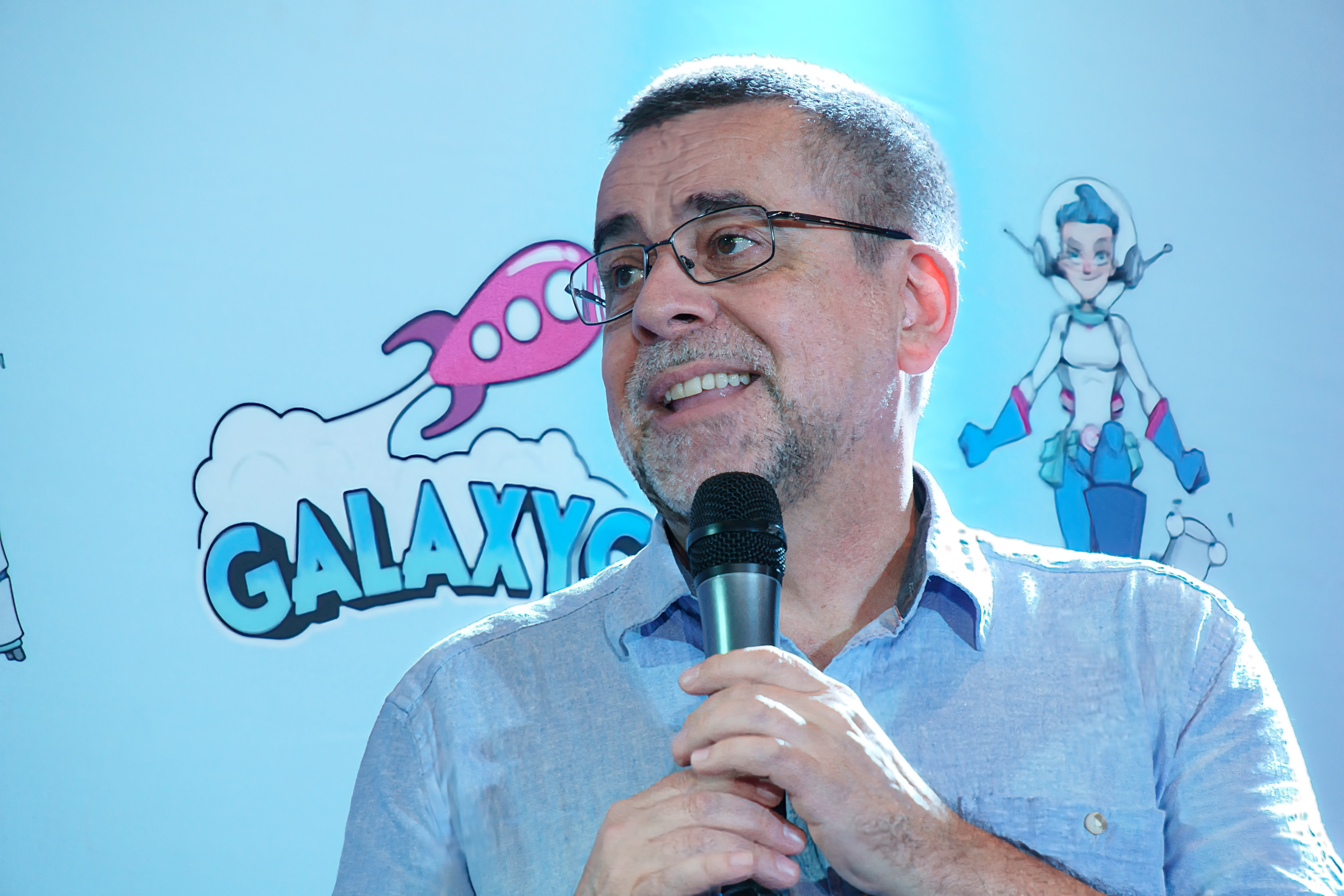
Mike Quinn at Galaxy Con Raleigh 2023

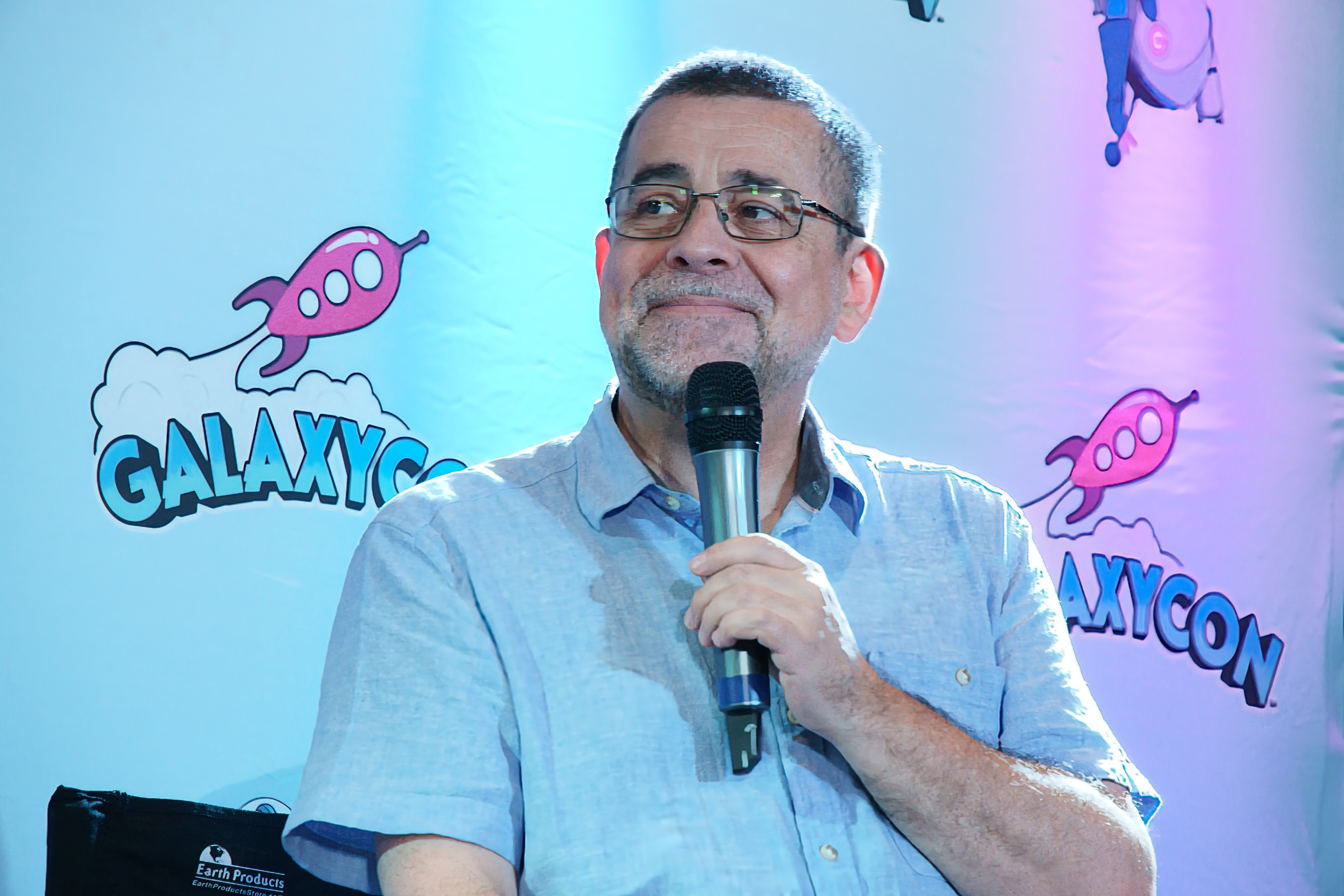
Mike Quinn at Galaxy Con Raleigh 2023

Quinn was born in London, but grew up in Enfield, Middlesex. He began puppeteering at age eight.

In 1977, Mike regularly visited the set of The Muppet Show with his homemade puppets, eventually meeting Jim Henson. Through his visits, he learned more about puppeteering and received encouragement from Jim Henson and his co-workers.

After leaving school in 1980, Quinn joined The Jim Henson Company and worked on the 1981 film The Great Muppet Caper puppeteering in crowd scenes and acting as a double for various main Muppet characters. Quinn later designed and built the Podlings for The Dark Crystal, where he also performed the Skeksis Slave Master SkekNa (who was voiced by David Buck).

During the filming of Return of the Jedi, Quinn (and David Barclay and David Greenaway) were assistant puppeteers to Frank Oz in his performance of Yoda. He also performed the role of Nien Nunb in Return Of the Jedi. Between the late 1980s and early 1990s, Quinn joined with fellow puppeteer David Barclay, creating Ultimate Animates, a production company specializing in new building and performing techniques for internal and external puppet productions.

Quinn joined George Lucas's Industrial Light and Magic as an animator, first working on Jurassic Park III and then Star Wars: Episode II – Attack of the Clones.

He reprised his role as Nien Nunb in Star Wars: The Force Awakens, a role that he reprised again in Star Wars: The Last Jedi and Star Wars: The Rise of Skywalker, and performed for the Disney theme park ride Star Wars: Rise of the Resistance.

In 2018, Quinn provided the voice of the Stan Laurel-based character Agnes Packard in the Cartoon Network series Mighty Magiswords opposing Ken Mitchroney voicing her Oliver Hardy-based husband Mr. Pachydermus in the episode "Pachydermus Packard and the Camp of Fantasy".

Quinn appeared as a guest on The George Lucas Talk Show during their May the AR Be LI$$ You Arli$$ Marathon fundraiser.

== Personal life ==
From 1989 to 2004, Quinn was married to fellow puppeteer Karen Prell.

== Filmography ==
=== Film ===
Year	Title	Role	Notes
1981	The Great Muppet Caper	Additional Muppets	
1982	The Dark Crystal	SkekNa - the slavemaster Skeksis	Performer plus puppet builder
1983	Return of the Jedi	Nien Nunb and various roles	Yoda (assistant performer)
1985	Dreamchild	Puppeteer	
1986	Little Shop of Horrors	Puppeteer	
1986	Labyrinth	Goblins plus various	Puppeteer
1986	The Tale of the Bunny Picnic	Bulbous, Mayor Bunnyparte	
1988	Who Framed Roger Rabbit	Puppeteer	
1989	How to Get Ahead in Advertising	Puppeteer of the boil and growing head	
1992	The Muppet Christmas Carol	Undertaker	performer of Miss Piggy and Fozzie Bear
1996	Muppet Treasure Island	Additional Muppets	
1996	Mary Reilly	Special effects Puppeteer	
1998	A Bug's Life	Animator	
1999	Toy Story 2	Animator, including the 'Woody's Roundup' TV sequence	
2001	Jurassic Park III	Dinosaur animator	
2002	Star Wars Episode II Attack of the Clones	Animator	
2005	The Muppets' Wizard of Oz	Additional Muppets	Credited as Michael Quinn
2011	The Muppets	Additional Muppets	
2014	Muppets Most Wanted	Additional Muppets	
2015	Star Wars: The Force Awakens	Nien Nunb	
2017	Star Wars: The Last Jedi	Nien Nunb	
2019	Star Wars: The Rise of Skywalker	Nien Nunb	

=== Television ===
Year	Title	Role	Notes
1983–87	Fraggle Rock	Gobo Fraggle (UK and French versions), Traveling Matt (UK and French versions), Sprocket (French and German versions) and various	recorded regional variations for UK, Germany, France
1987	Jim Henson's Mother Goose Stories	Brown Gosling, Humpty Dumpty, plus various	Credited as Mike Quinby
1988	The Storyteller	Devil	Episode: "The Soldier and Death" puppeteer
1989	The Ghost of Faffner Hall	Riff, synthesiser fly	
1993	The Great Bong	Producer, director, puppeteer, puppet builder	
1994	The Secret Life of Toys	Various, Rabbit Lamp	
1994	Jim Henson's Animal Show	Chuck The Lion	4 episodes
1995	Heroes of Comedy	Designer, builder, performer of Max Miller pupp	Event Series 1, Episode 3
1995–97	The Slow Norris	Puppeteer, Puppet Builder	
2005	The Muppets' Wizard of Oz	Muppet Performer	
2013	Shake It Up	Parrot	Episode: "Ty It Up"
2013	Good Luck Charlie	Additional Muppet Performer	Episode: "Duncan Dream House"
2013	Glee	Puppeteer	Episode: "Puppet Master"
2015–16	The Muppets	Additional Muppet Performer	
2018	Mighty Magiswords	Agnes Packard	Episode: "Pachydermus Packard and the Camp of Fantasy"
2018–20	Kidding	Secret Chef, Wedding Groomsman and Puppeteer	4 episodes
2020	Muppets Now	Additional Muppet Performer	6 episodes
2020	The George Lucas Talk Show	Himself	May the AR Be LI$$ You (Arli$$ Marathon fundraiser)

=== Other appearances ===
Year	Title	Role	Notes
2015	TEDx Talk	Assistant puppeteer to Kermit the Frog	
2016	Outside Lands Music Festival Golden Gate Park, San Francisco	Muppet Performer for Dr. Teeth and the Electric Mayhem	August 7
2017	The Muppets Take the Bowl	Additional Muppet Performer	Live show at the Hollywood Bowl, September 8–10
2018	The Muppets Take the O2	Additional Muppet Performer and voices	Live show at the O2 Arena London, July
2019 and continuing	Disney Theme Park Ride Star Wars: Rise of the Resistance	Nien Nunb	Star Wars: Galaxy's Edge at Disney's Hollywood Studios and Disneyland
