= Jabba the Hutt =

Fictional character from Star Wars

- Star Wars character
- Jabba the Hutt in Return of the Jedi (1983)
- First appearance: Return of the Jedi
- Created by: George Lucas
- Voiced by: Larry Ward (Note: Return of the Jedi); Ben Burtt (Note: Star Wars Special Edition The Phantom Menace); Ed Asner (Note: Return of the Jedi radio drama); Clint Bajakian (Note: The Phantom Menace (video game) Star Wars: Demolition Star Wars: Galactic Battlegrounds Star Wars: Bounty Hunter); David W. Collins (Note: Star Wars: The Force Unleashed); Brian Drummond (Note: Lego Star Wars: The Yoda Chronicles); Kevin M. Richardson (Note: The Clone Wars film and television series Disney Infinity 3.0 Lego Star Wars: The Freemaker Adventures Lego Star Wars: The Skywalker Saga); Dee Bradley Baker (Note: Star Wars: Outlaws)
- Performed by: David Barclay; Toby Philpott; Mike Edmonds

In-universe information
- Full name: Jabba Desilijic Tiure
- Species: Hutt
- Gender: Male
- Occupation: Crime boss
- Affiliation: Grand Hutt Council; Crymorah Syndicate
- Family: Crakka (cousin); Ebor (uncle); Gorga (nephew); Graballa (nephew); "The Twins" (cousins); Ziro (uncle); Others in Legends (Note: Jabba the Hutt's family members in the Star Wars Legends narrative universe include his father Zorba, his uncle Jiliac, his uncle Pazda, and his nephew Grubba.)
- Children: Rotta (son)
- Homeworld: Nal Hutta

Jabba the Hutt (/ˈdʒɑːbə/ JAH-bə) is a fictional character in the Star Wars franchise. He is a large, slug-like crime lord of the Hutt species. Jabba first appeared in the 1983 film Return of the Jedi, in which he is portrayed by a one-ton puppet operated by several puppeteers. In 1997, he appeared in the Special Edition of the original Star Wars film, which had been retitled Star Wars: Episode IV—A New Hope. Jabba made his third film appearance in the 1999 prequel film The Phantom Menace. Jabba is voiced by Larry Ward in Return of the Jedi, and Ben Burtt in A New Hope Special Edition and The Phantom Menace. In the end credits of The Phantom Menace, Jabba is also credited as playing "himself".

In the original film trilogy, Jabba lives in a palace on the desert planet Tatooine. He places a bounty on the smuggler Han Solo, and sends bounty hunters to capture him. After Darth Vader freezes Solo in carbonite, the bounty hunter Boba Fett delivers the frozen Solo to Jabba, who puts him on display in his palace. A group of Solo's friends attempt to rescue him, but are captured by Jabba; he enslaves Princess Leia and decrees that Luke Skywalker, Chewbacca, and Solo will be fed to a Sarlacc. Luke orchestrates an escape, and during the chaos Leia strangles Jabba to death.

== Creation and portrayal ==
=== Star Wars ===
George Lucas wrote and directed Star Wars, which was released in 1977. The script included a scene in which the smuggler Han Solo negotiates with Jabba about a payment he owes him. The scene was meant to give Solo the motivation to transport dangerous passengers for a high fare. It was also meant to explain why Solo was imprisoned in the following film, The Empire Strikes Back.

In a 1985 interview, Lucas said that he originally imagined Jabba as a furry creature that resembled a Wookiee. By the time he completed the Star Wars screenplay, Jabba had evolved into a fat, slug-like creature with a gaping mouth and eyes on extended feelers. When filming Jabba's scene, Declan Mulholland served as a stand-in for Jabba; Lucas planned to replace Mulholland in post-production with an animated creature. Lucas ultimately cut the scene due to budget and time constraints, and because he felt it did not contribute to the film's plot. According to Paul Blake, who plays the bounty hunter Greedo, his character's scene was added to Star Wars after Lucas decided to cut the scene with Jabba.

=== Return of the Jedi ===
Although Jabba did not appear in the original version of Star Wars, he is mentioned in the film and its first sequel, The Empire Strikes Back. He finally appears in the second sequel, Return of the Jedi (1983). His appearance is similar to the way he was described in the Star Wars script—a large, slug-like creature with a wide mouth. Before Lucas settled on this design, he considered other versions of the character. At various points, Jabba resembled an ape, a worm and a snail. One design made Jabba appear almost human, resembling a Fu Manchu character. Nilo Rodis-Jamero, the costume designer for Return of the Jedi, said he had envisioned Jabba as a refined, intelligent man resembling Orson Welles.

After an initial Jabba design was approved, further design work was done by Phil Tippett, the film's visual effects artist. He based Jabba's body structure and reproductive system on the anatomy of annelid worms. He modeled Jabba's head on that of a snake, complete with bulbous, slit-pupilled eyes and a mouth that opens wide enough to swallow large prey. He gave Jabba's skin a moist, amphibian quality. (Note: Attributed to multiple references:)

Concept art of Jabba the Hutt for Return of the Jedi

The next task was to create the Jabba puppet, a process which took three months and cost $500,000. Stuart Freeborn and the Industrial Light & Magic Creature Shop designed the one-ton puppet, while John Coppinger sculpted its latex, clay, and foam pieces. The puppet had its own makeup artist and required three puppeteers to operate, making it one of the largest puppets ever used in a film. The puppeteers included David Barclay, Toby Philpott, and Mike Edmonds, who were members of Jim Henson's Muppet group. Barclay operated the right arm and mouth, while Philpott controlled the left arm, head, and tongue. Edmonds was responsible for the movement of Jabba's tail. The character's eyes and face were operated by radio control. (Note: Attributed to multiple references:) Lucas complained about the difficulty of moving the massive puppet around the set. He was also disappointed by its appearance, later stating that Jabba would have been a computer-generated character if the required technology had existed at the time.

Jabba's voice was provided by Larry Ward, (Note: Attributed to multiple references:) who was uncredited in the film. Ward, a linguist from the University of California, Berkeley, collaborated with Burtt on the creation of the Huttese language. A heavy, booming quality was given to Ward's voice by pitching it an octave lower than normal and processing it through a subharmonic generator. (Note: Attributed to multiple references:) Jabba's burping sounds were provided by the sound engineer Howie Hammerman. Wet, slimy sound effects were recorded to accompany the movement of Jabba's body and mouth; some of the sounds were created by moving human hands around in a bowl of cheese casserole. For a scene in which Jabba and his minions are laughing together, the laughter was created by mixing human laughter with noises of hippos, hyenas and other animals. The film's composer, John Williams, arranged a musical theme for Jabba that is played on a tuba. He later turned the theme into a symphonic piece which he performed with the Boston Pops Orchestra, and which was described as both "monstrous" and "lyrical" by the musicologist Gerald Sloan. According to the film historian Laurent Bouzereau, Jabba's strangulation by Leia was inspired by a scene from The Godfather (1972), in which the obese character Luca Brasi is garroted by an assassin.

=== A New Hope – 1997 Special Edition ===
Harrison Ford as Han Solo (left) and Declan Mulholland, the stand-in for Jabba the Hutt

A digital version of Jabba replaced Mulholland in the 1997 Special Edition of A New Hope.

In 1997, the Special Edition of Star Wars was released, now titled Star Wars: Episode IV—A New Hope. Lucas revisited the Jabba scene he had filmed—and ultimately cut—and completed it for the Special Edition, replacing the stand-in actor Declan Mulholland with a computer-generated version of Jabba. Lucas also replaced the English dialogue with Huttese, a fictional language created by Ben Burtt, the film's sound designer. (Note: Huttese was based on the Quechuan languages.) The scene consisted of five shots and took over a year to complete. Joseph Letteri, the visual effects supervisor for the Special Edition, said his goal was to make Jabba look as realistic as a flesh-and-blood character. The scene was refined for the 2004 DVD release, with improvements to Jabba's appearance made possible by advancements in CGI.

At one point during the scene, Harrison Ford walks behind Mulholland. This became a problem when adding the digital Jabba, since his tail would be in Solo's path. The solution was to have Solo step on Jabba's tail, causing him to yelp in pain. In the 2004 DVD release, Jabba reacts more strongly, seemingly ready to punch Solo. In this version, shadows cast by Solo were added to Jabba's body to make the CGI more convincing. According to Lucas, some viewers were disappointed with the digital Jabba's appearance, complaining that the character did not look realistic. Lucas dismissed this criticism, saying that regardless of whether a character is portrayed by a puppet or CGI, it will always look unrealistic to some degree.

== Characterization ==
Jabba has been described as an exemplar of lust, sloth, gluttony, and greed. His criminal operations include slavery, gunrunning, spice-smuggling and extortion, and he amuses himself by torturing, humiliating and killing both his enemies and his own subordinates. He surrounds himself with scantily-clad slave girls of various species, often chained to his dais. Jabba's appetite is insatiable, and he sometimes threatens to eat his underlings.

In Return of the Jedi, Solo calls Jabba a "slimy piece of worm-ridden filth". The writers Martha Veitch and Tom Veitch called his body a "miasmic mass" that seems to release "a greasy discharge, sending fresh waves of rotten stench" into the air. Arthur Knight of The Hollywood Reporter described Jabba as a "truly frightening ... walrus-shaped grotesque." The science fiction writer Jeanne Cavelos wrote that he deserves an award for "most disgusting alien", while the film critic Roger Ebert described him as loathsome and evil.

== Appearances ==
=== Films ===
Although he was mentioned in previous films, Jabba was first seen in Return of the Jedi (1983), the third film of the original trilogy. The beginning of the film features the attempts of Princess Leia, Chewbacca and Luke Skywalker to rescue Han Solo, who was imprisoned in carbonite in The Empire Strikes Back (1980). Jabba has put the hibernating Solo on display in his throne room as a decoration. Leia is able to free Han from the carbonite, but she is caught and enslaved by Jabba, who forces her to wear a metal bikini. Luke arrives to bargain for Solo's life, but Jabba rejects his offer and attempts to feed him to a rancor. After Luke kills the monster, Jabba decrees that he, Solo and Chewbacca will be fed to a Sarlacc, a deadly ground-dwelling beast. Luke orchestrates an escape with the help of R2-D2, and defeats Jabba's thugs. During the chaos, Leia strangles Jabba to death with the chain used to enslave her. As Luke and his friends depart, Jabba's sail barge explodes.

Jabba appears in the Special Edition of Star Wars, which was released in 1997. In the film, Jabba meets with Solo, who pledges to pay Jabba for lost cargo. Jabba threatens to place a large bounty on him if he does not follow through. Jabba also appears briefly in the 1999 prequel film The Phantom Menace. He launches a podrace at Mos Espa, then falls asleep and misses the conclusion of the race.

=== The Clone Wars ===
Jabba's son Rotta is captured by Separatists in the animated film The Clone Wars (2008). It is later revealed that Ziro, Jabba's uncle, took part in the kidnapping as part of his plan to take control of the Hutt Clan. The Jedi Knight Anakin Skywalker and his apprentice Ahsoka Tano return Rotta to Jabba in exchange for the safe passage of Republic ships through his territory. Padmé Amidala exposes Ziro's crimes to Jabba who vows that Ziro will be severely punished.

Jabba appears in several episodes of The Clone Wars series (2008–2014; 2020). In "Sphere of Influence", he is confronted by Chairman Papanoida, whose daughters were kidnapped by Greedo. Jabba allows a sample of Greedo's blood to be taken to prove he is the kidnapper. In "Evil Plans", Jabba hires the bounty hunter Cad Bane to bring him plans for the Galactic Senate building. When Bane returns with the plans, Jabba and the Hutt Council send him to free Ziro from prison. Jabba makes a brief appearance in "Hunt for Ziro", in which he laughs at his uncle's death at the hands of Sy Snootles, and pays her for delivering Ziro's holo-diary. In "Eminence", Jabba and the Hutt Council are approached by the Shadow Collective leaders Darth Maul, Savage Opress and Pre Vizsla. Jabba is not willing to ally with them, and sends the bounty hunters Embo, Dengar, Sugi and Latts Razzi to capture them. After a battle, the Shadow Collective confronts Jabba at his palace on Tatooine, where he finally agrees to an alliance.

=== Other ===
Jabba is voiced by Ed Asner in the radio dramatizations of the original trilogy.

== Star Wars Legends ==
Following the acquisition of Lucasfilm by The Walt Disney Company in 2012, most of the licensed Star Wars novels and comics produced between 1977 and 2014 were rebranded as Star Wars Legends and declared non-canon to the franchise. The Legends works comprise a separate narrative universe. (Note: Attributed to multiple references:)

"Jabba the Hut" as he appears in Marvel Comics' adaptation of the first Star Wars film

The first appearances of Jabba in any visual capacity were in Marvel Comics' adaptation of A New Hope, which includes Six Against the Galaxy (1977), What Ever Happened to Jabba the Hut? (1979) (Note: "Hutt" was originally spelled "Hut".) and In Mortal Combat (1980). In these comics, Jabba appears as a tall humanoid with a walrus-like face, a topknot, and a brightly-colored uniform. He was based on a character later named Mosep Binneed, who appears briefly in the Mos Eisley Cantina scene in Star Wars.

While awaiting the sequel to Star Wars, Marvel kept the monthly comic going with its own stories, one of which depicts Jabba tracking down Solo and Chewbacca to an old hideaway they use for smuggling. Circumstances force Jabba to lift the bounty on Solo and Chewbacca, which enables them to return to Tatooine for an adventure with Luke. In another story, Solo kills the space pirate Crimson Jack and busts up his operation, which Jabba bankrolled. Jabba then renews the bounty on Solo.

The 1977 novelization of Lucas's Star Wars script describes Jabba as a "great mobile tub of muscle and suet topped by a shaggy scarred skull", but gives no further detail about his appearance or species.

Zorba the Hutt's Revenge (1992), a young-adult novel by Paul and Hollace Davids, identifies Jabba's father as another powerful crime lord named Zorba and reveals that Jabba was born 596 years before the events of A New Hope, making him around 600 years old at the time of his death in Return of the Jedi. Four comics exploring Jabba's backstory were written by Jim Woodring and released by Dark Horse Comics between 1995–1996; these were published collectively as Jabba the Hutt: The Art of the Deal in 1998. Ann C. Crispin's novel The Hutt Gambit (1997) explains how Jabba and Solo become business associates and depicts the events that lead to a bounty being placed on Han's head.

Tales from Jabba's Palace (1996), a collection of short stories edited by Kevin J. Anderson, pieces together the lives of Jabba's various minions and their relationship to him during the last days of his life. These stories reveal that many of Jabba's servants are resentful towards him and want to assassinate him. After Jabba is killed in Return of the Jedi, his surviving courtiers join forces with his rivals on Tatooine. At the same time, Jabba's family on the Hutt homeworld Nal Hutta make claims to his palace, fortune, and criminal empire. Timothy Zahn's novel Heir to the Empire (1991) reveals that a smuggler named Talon Karrde eventually replaces Jabba as the "big fish in the pond" and moves the headquarters of his criminal empire off of Tatooine.

== Reception ==
The Telegraph called Jabba one of the most memorable creatures in the Star Wars franchise. Business Insider's Travis Clark said, "Like Stormtroopers or Darth Vader, some villains just come to mind when you think of Star Wars. Jabba is another one of them." Rolling Stone said that Jabba is "without a doubt the finest Star Wars portrait of the id" and that one has to "admire his dedication of being his true, absolutely horrendous self". The Denver Post applauded the special effects team on Return of the Jedi for making Jabba look like a "horrid creature".

Several commentators have derided the computer-generated versions of Jabba and other Hutts. Phil Owen of TheWrap said the digital Jabba in the 1997 release of A New Hope looked "incredibly horrible", while Matt Goldberg of Collider called it "awful". After the appearance of the Hutt Twins in the series The Book of Boba Fett, Matt Singer of ScreenCrush wrote that no Hutt should ever be computer-generated, as it does not appear realistic.
