= Return of the Jedi =

1983 film directed by Richard Marquand

- Theatrical release poster by Kazuhiko Sano
- Directed by: Richard Marquand
- Screenplay by: Lawrence Kasdan; George Lucas
- Story by: George Lucas
- Produced by: Howard Kazanjian
- Starring: Mark Hamill; Harrison Ford; Carrie Fisher; Billy Dee Williams; Anthony Daniels; David Prowse; Kenny Baker; Peter Mayhew; Frank Oz
- Cinematography: Alan Hume
- Edited by: Sean Barton; Marcia Lucas; Duwayne Dunham
- Music by: John Williams
- Production company: Lucasfilm Ltd.
- Distributed by: 20th Century-Fox
- Release date: May 25, 1983
- Running time: 132 minutes
- Country: United States
- Language: English
- Budget: $32.5–42.7 million
- Box office: $482 million

Return of the Jedi (also known as Star Wars: Episode VI – Return of the Jedi) is a 1983 American epic space opera film directed by Richard Marquand from a screenplay by Lawrence Kasdan and George Lucas. The sequel to The Empire Strikes Back (1980), it is the third installment in the original Star Wars trilogy and the sixth chronological film in the "Skywalker Saga". The film follows the ongoing struggle between the malevolent Galactic Empire and the freedom fighters of the Rebel Alliance. As the Rebels attempt to destroy the Empire's second Death Star, Luke Skywalker tries to bring his father, Darth Vader, back from the dark side of the Force. The film stars Mark Hamill, Harrison Ford, Carrie Fisher, Billy Dee Williams, Anthony Daniels, David Prowse, Kenny Baker, Peter Mayhew, and Frank Oz.

Steven Spielberg, David Lynch, and David Cronenberg were considered to direct the film before Marquand signed on as the director. The production team relied on Lucas' storyboards during pre-production. While writing the shooting script, Lucas, Kasdan, Marquand, and producer Howard Kazanjian spent two weeks in conference discussing ideas to construct it. Kazanjian's schedule pushed shooting to begin a few weeks early to allow Industrial Light & Magic more time to work on the film's effects in post-production. Filming took place in England, California, and Arizona from January to May 1982.

Return of the Jedi was released in theaters by 20th Century-Fox on May 25, 1983. It grossed $374 million worldwide during its initial theatrical run, becoming the highest-grossing film of 1983. It received mixed reviews, with critics conflicted on the performances of the actors, the special effects and the action sequences, though John Williams' score was consistently praised. Later reviews have been more positive, although most critics consider the film to be the weakest of the original trilogy. Several re-releases and revisions to the film have followed over the decades, which have brought its total gross to $482 million. The United States Library of Congress selected it for preservation in the National Film Registry in 2021. A prequel trilogy, released between 1999 and 2005, and a sequel trilogy, released between 2015 and 2019, followed.

== Plot ==
One year after Han Solo's capture and imprisonment in carbonite, (Note: As depicted in The Empire Strikes Back (1980).) C-3PO and R2-D2 enter the palace of the crime lord Jabba the Hutt on Tatooine. They were sent as a goodwill gift from Luke Skywalker, who hopes to negotiate with Jabba for Han's release. Disguised as a bounty hunter, Princess Leia infiltrates the palace under the pretense of having captured Chewbacca. She releases Han from the carbonite but is caught by Jabba and enslaved. Luke arrives to bargain for the release of his friends, but Jabba drops him through a trapdoor to be eaten by a rancor. After Luke kills the beast, Jabba decrees that he, Han, and Chewbacca will be fed to a Sarlacc, a deadly ground-dwelling creature. However, Luke retrieves his new lightsaber from R2-D2, and the group of friends battle Jabba's thugs aboard his sail barge. During the chaos, Boba Fett is swallowed by the Sarlacc, and Leia strangles Jabba to death with her chains. The group escapes as Jabba's sail barge is destroyed.

As the others rendezvous with the Rebel Alliance, Luke returns to Dagobah to complete his Jedi training with Yoda, who is dying when he arrives. Before Yoda dies, he confirms that Darth Vader is Luke's father, the former Jedi Knight Anakin Skywalker, and that there is another Skywalker. Obi-Wan Kenobi's Force spirit tells Luke that Leia is his twin sister, and that he must face Vader again to finish his training and defeat the Empire.

The Alliance learns that the Empire has been constructing a second Death Star under the supervision of the Emperor. The station is protected by an energy shield on the forest moon of Endor. Han leads a strike team, including Luke, Leia, and Chewbacca, to destroy its generator. Once on the moon, the team gains the trust of an Ewok tribe. Luke tells Leia she is his sister, and that Vader is their father. He then surrenders to Imperial troops and is brought before Vader, but fails to convince him to reject the dark side of the Force.

Luke is taken to the Emperor, who intends to turn him to the dark side. He reveals that Luke's friends on Endor and the rebel fleet are heading into a trap. On the forest moon, Han's team is captured by Imperial forces, but the Ewoks counterattack, allowing the Rebels to infiltrate the shield generator. Meanwhile, Lando Calrissian and Admiral Ackbar lead the rebel assault on the Death Star, but find its shield still active and the Imperial fleet waiting for them.

The Emperor reveals to Luke that the Death Star is fully operational and orders the firing of its superlaser, which begins destroying rebel capital ships. He tempts Luke to give in to his anger and embrace the dark side of the Force. Luke attacks him, but Vader intervenes, and the two engage in a lightsaber duel. During the battle, Vader learns Luke has a sister, and he threatens to turn her to the dark side. Luke becomes enraged and severs Vader's prosthetic hand. The Emperor orders Luke to kill his father, but Luke refuses. The Emperor then tortures Luke with Force lightning. Unwilling to let his son die, Vader throws the Emperor down a shaft to his demise, but is fatally wounded in the process. Before dying, Vader asks Luke to remove his mask in a moment of reconciliation.

After the rebel strike team destroys the shield generator, Lando leads fighter ships into the Death Star's core. He and the X-wing pilot Wedge Antilles destroy the station's main reactor, escaping before it explodes. Later, Luke cremates Vader's body on Endor before reuniting with his friends. As the Rebels celebrate their victory, Luke sees the Force spirits of Obi-Wan, Yoda, and Anakin Skywalker standing nearby.

== Cast ==
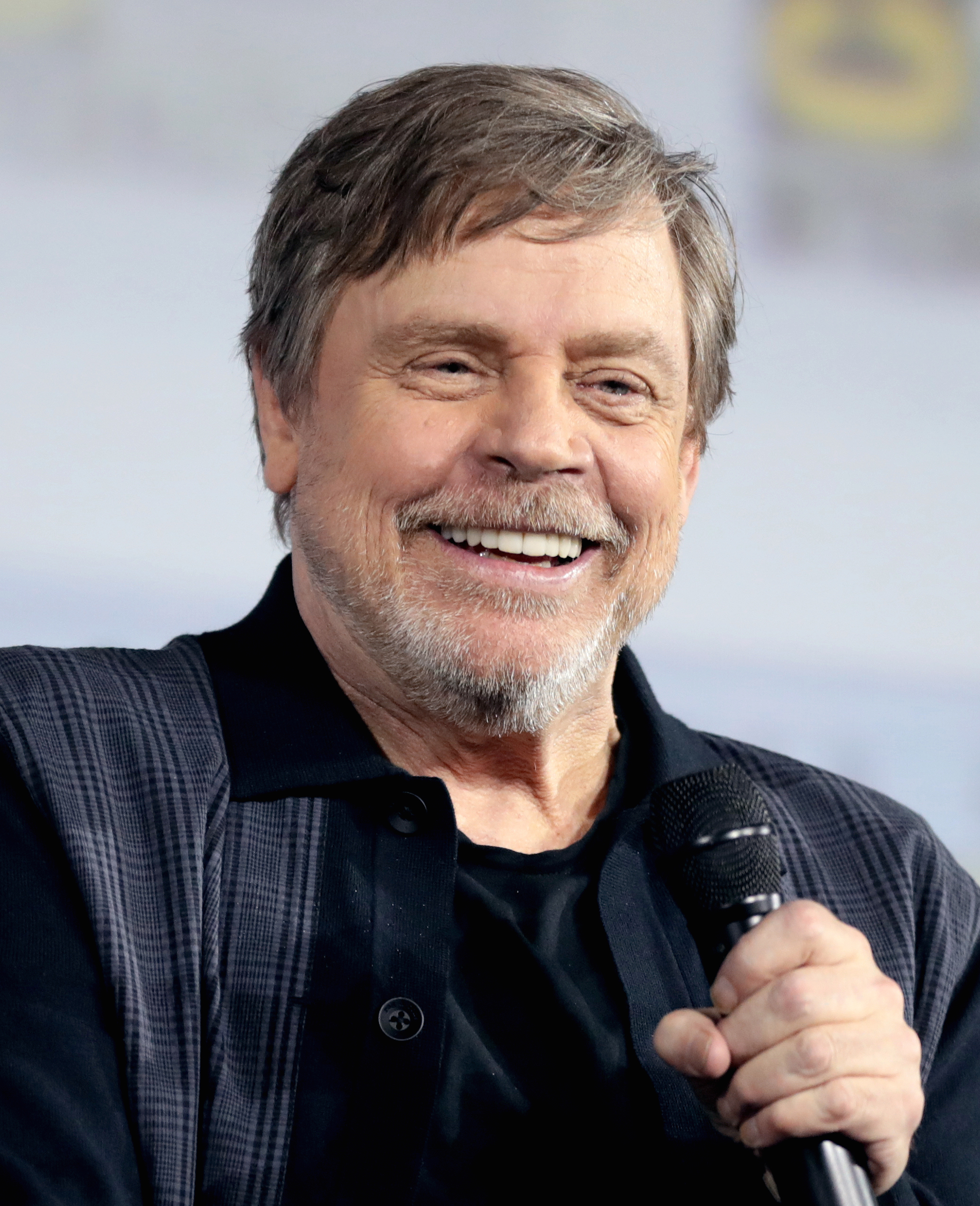
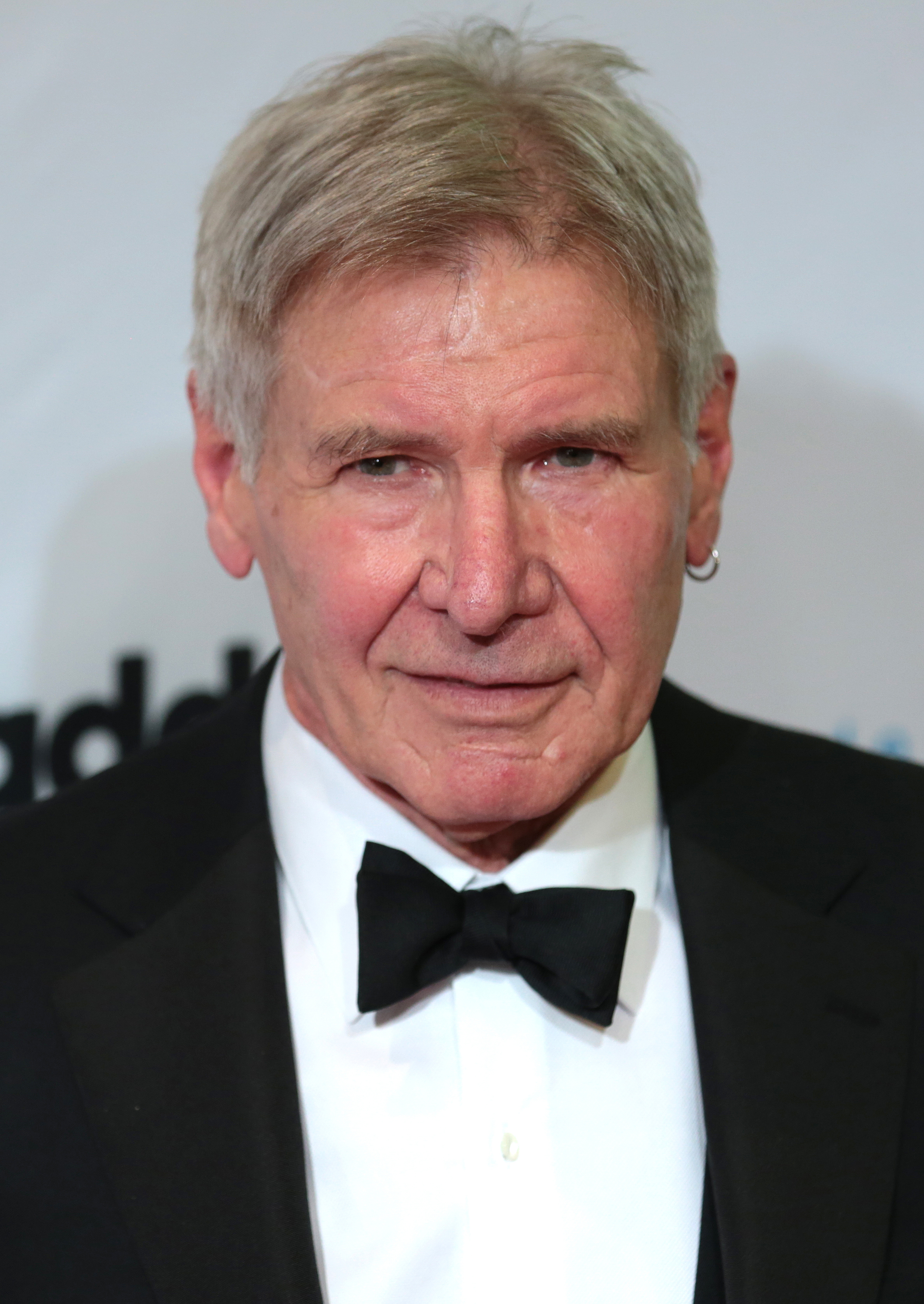
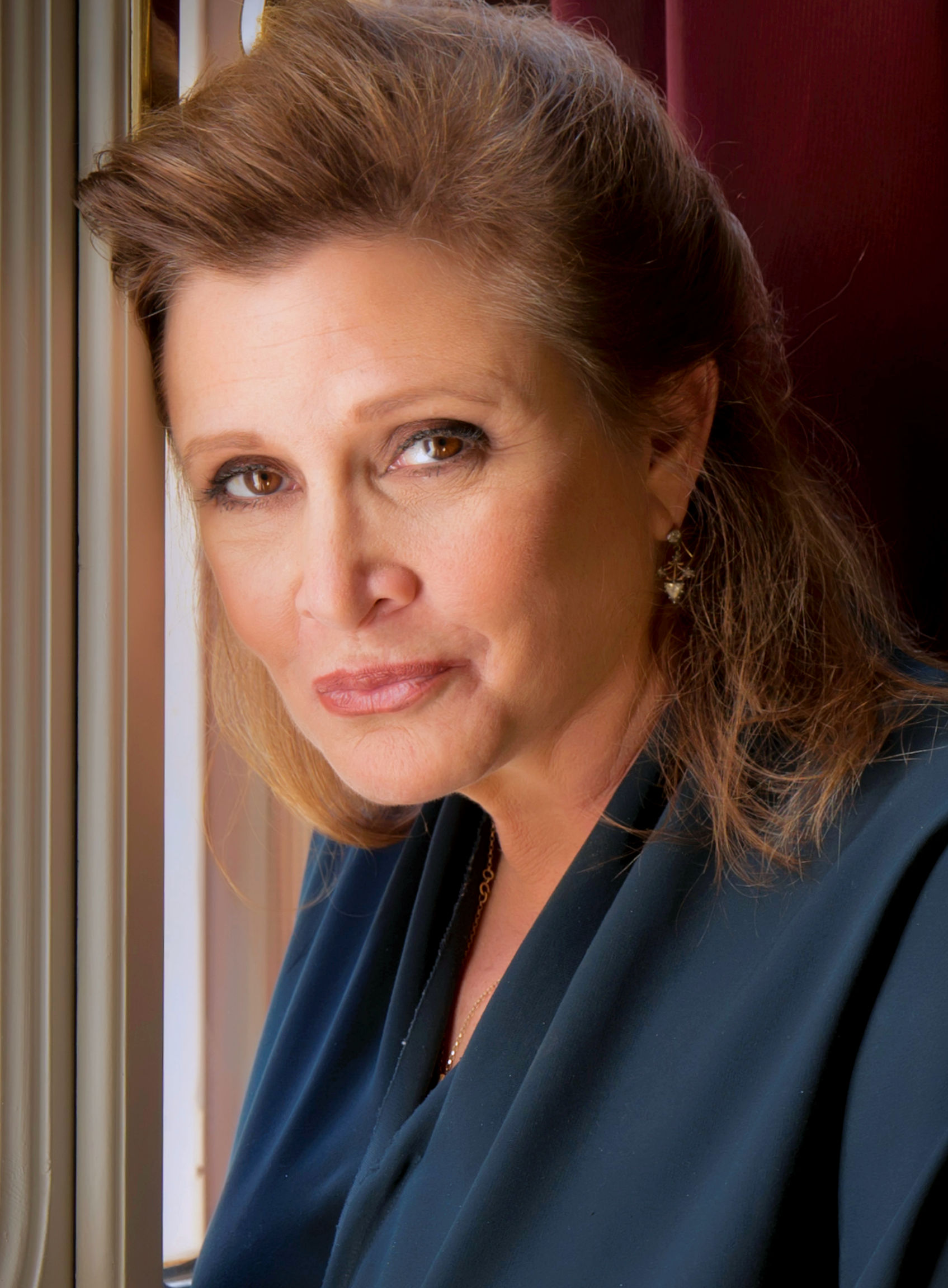
Left to right: Mark Hamill (pictured in 2019), Harrison Ford (2017), and Carrie Fisher (2013)
- Mark Hamill as Luke Skywalker: A Jedi in training, a pilot in the Rebel Alliance, the son of Darth Vader and the twin brother of Leia
- Harrison Ford as Han Solo: A rebel general and the captain of the Millennium Falcon (Note: Attributed to multiple references:)
- Carrie Fisher as Leia Organa: A leader of the Rebel Alliance, the twin sister of Luke and the daughter of Darth Vader
- Billy Dee Williams as Lando Calrissian: The former administrator of Cloud City, Han's friend, and a rebel general
- Anthony Daniels as C-3PO: A humanoid protocol droid
- Peter Mayhew as Chewbacca: Han's Wookiee friend and the co-pilot of the Millennium Falcon
- Kenny Baker as
  - R2-D2: An astromech droid
  - Paploo: An Ewok who aids the Rebels on Endor
- Ian McDiarmid as the Emperor: The ruler of the Galactic Empire and Darth Vader's master
- Frank Oz (puppeteer/voice) as Yoda: A centuries-old Jedi Master who trained Luke
- David Prowse / James Earl Jones (voice) as Darth Vader: A former Jedi and Luke and Leia's father, as well as the Emperor's disciple
- Sebastian Shaw as Anakin Skywalker: The unmasked Vader who also appears as a Force spirit (Note: In the original version of Return of the Jedi, Shaw portrays both the unmasked Anakin and the character's Force spirit. In the 2004 re-release of the film, Hayden Christensen replaces Shaw as the spirit.)
- Alec Guinness as Obi-Wan Kenobi: The deceased Jedi mentor of Luke who continues to guide him as a Force spirit
- Toby Philpott, Mike Edmonds, David Barclay (puppeteers) and Larry A. Ward (voice) as Jabba the Hutt: A slug-like alien crime lord who purchased the carbonite-frozen Han from the bounty hunter Boba Fett

The cast also includes Michael Pennington as Moff Jerjerrod, Kenneth Colley as Admiral Piett, Michael Carter as Bib Fortuna (voiced by Erik Bauersfeld, who was uncredited), Denis Lawson as Wedge, Tim Rose as Admiral Ackbar (also voiced by Bauersfeld, again uncredited), Dermot Crowley as General Madine, Caroline Blakiston as Mon Mothma, Warwick Davis as Wicket W. Warrick, Tony Cox as Widdle 'Willy' Warrick, Jeremy Bulloch as Boba Fett, Femi Taylor as Oola, Annie Arbogast as Sy Snootles, (Note: The character Sy Snootles is portrayed by a puppet, with Arbogast providing the voice. In the Special Edition version of the film, the puppet is replaced with a computer-generated Sy Snootles.) Claire Davenport as Fat Dancer, Jack Purvis as Teebo, Mike Edmonds as Logray, Jane Busby as Chief Chirpa, Malcom Dixon and Mike Cottrell as Ewok Warriors, and Nicki Reade as Nicki. Additional Imperial officers are portrayed by Adam Bareham (Stardestroyer Controller #1), Jonathan Oliver (Stardestroyer Controller #2), Pip Miller (Stardestroyer Captain #1), and Tom Mannion (Stardestroyer Captain #2). Mark Dodson provided the voice of Salacious Crumb, but was uncredited.

== Production ==
=== Development ===
Following the commercial success of The Empire Strikes Back, a second Star Wars sequel was swiftly put into production. As with Empire, Lucas personally financed Return of the Jedi, but chose not to direct the film himself. Irvin Kershner, the director of Empire, declined to return for Jedi. Although Lucas' first choice for director was Steven Spielberg, their separate feuds with the Directors Guild of America led to Spielberg being banned from directing the film. Lucas approached David Lynch, who had recently been nominated for the Academy Award for Best Director for The Elephant Man (1980). Lynch declined, believing that Lucas should direct the film since Star Wars was his creation.

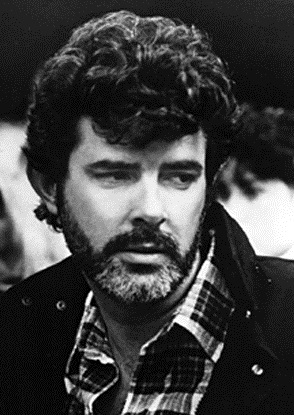
George Lucas (pictured in 1986)

Lucas offered David Cronenberg the chance to direct, but he turned down the offer, as he preferred to direct films he had written himself. Lucas also considered Lamont Johnson, the director of The Last American Hero (1973), before finally choosing Richard Marquand. Lucas was on set frequently because of Marquand's relative inexperience with special effects; Marquand joked that directing Jedi was like "trying to direct King Lear – with Shakespeare in the next room!" (Note: Lucas also operated the second camera a few times during filming.) Lucas praised Marquand's kindness and his ability to work with actors.

The screenplay for Jedi was based on a story by Lucas. The script was written by Lucas and Lawrence Kasdan, (Note: The screenplay contains uncredited contributions from Marquand and David Peoples.) who allegedly told Lucas that Return of the Jedi was a weak title. Kazanjian echoed Kasdan's concern, and the title was changed to Revenge of the Jedi soon after. The screenplay was not finished until late in pre-production, well after a production schedule and a budget had been created, and after Marquand had been hired, which was unusual for a film. Instead, the production team relied on Lucas' story and his rough draft of the script to guide their early work. When it came time to write a shooting script, Lucas, Kasdan, Marquand and Kazanjian spent two weeks in conference discussing ideas; Kasdan used tape transcripts of these meetings to construct the script.

The question of whether Harrison Ford would return for Return of the Jedi arose during pre-production. Unlike Mark Hamill and Carrie Fisher, Ford was not contracted for two sequels, and Raiders of the Lost Ark (1981) had made him an even bigger star. Kazanjian said that Han was frozen in carbonite in The Empire Strikes Back because the filmmakers were unsure whether the character would return. He also claimed that Lucas did not expect Ford to return, and that Han was initially not in the script. However, Kazanjian—who also produced Raiders of the Lost Ark—ultimately convinced Ford to return.

Ford felt that Han should die through self-sacrifice in Jedi. Kasdan agreed, and said it should occur near the beginning of the third act, to make the audience wonder whether the other protagonists will survive. Gary Kurtz, who produced Star Wars and Empire but was replaced by Kazanjian for Jedi, said that Han died in an early version of the script. Kurtz has suggested that one reason Lucas may have rejected the idea of Han dying was that it would not be good for merchandising. Kurtz also has claimed that an early script ended with the rebel forces in tatters, Leia grappling with her new duties as a queen, and Luke walking off alone "like Clint Eastwood in the spaghetti Westerns".

Yoda was originally not meant to appear in the film, but Marquand strongly felt that returning to Dagobah was essential because audiences would expect it. After speaking with a children's psychologist, Lucas was concerned that young viewers might think that Darth Vader had lied about being Luke's father in the previous film, and so he inserted a scene in which Yoda confirms Vader's claim. There were many other scenes that were changed during writing. At one point the Ewoks were going to be Wookiees, and the Millennium Falcon was going to land on Endor. The ending of the film was going to show Obi-Wan, Yoda and Anakin Skywalker returning to life from their spectral existence in the Force.

=== Casting ===
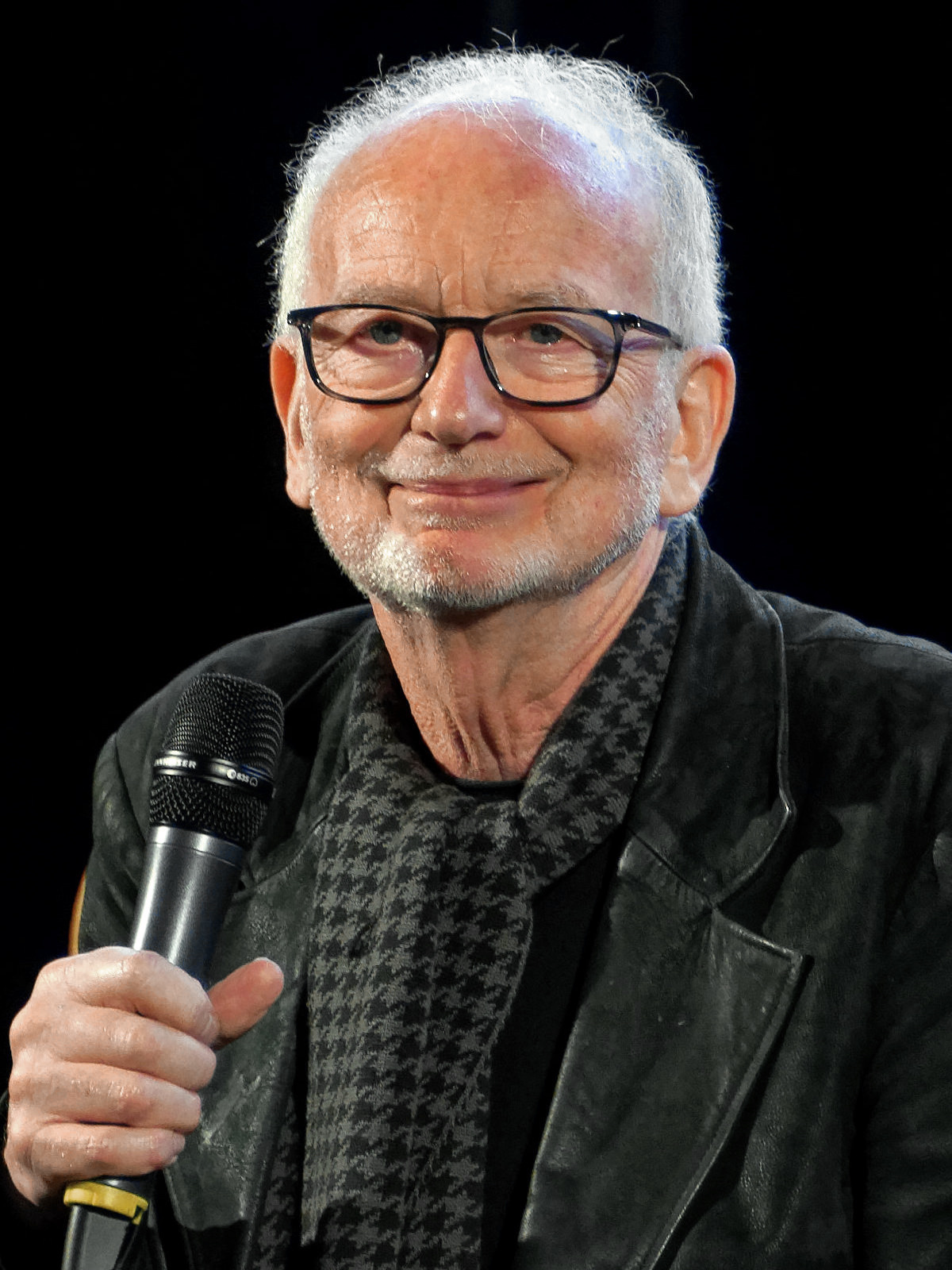
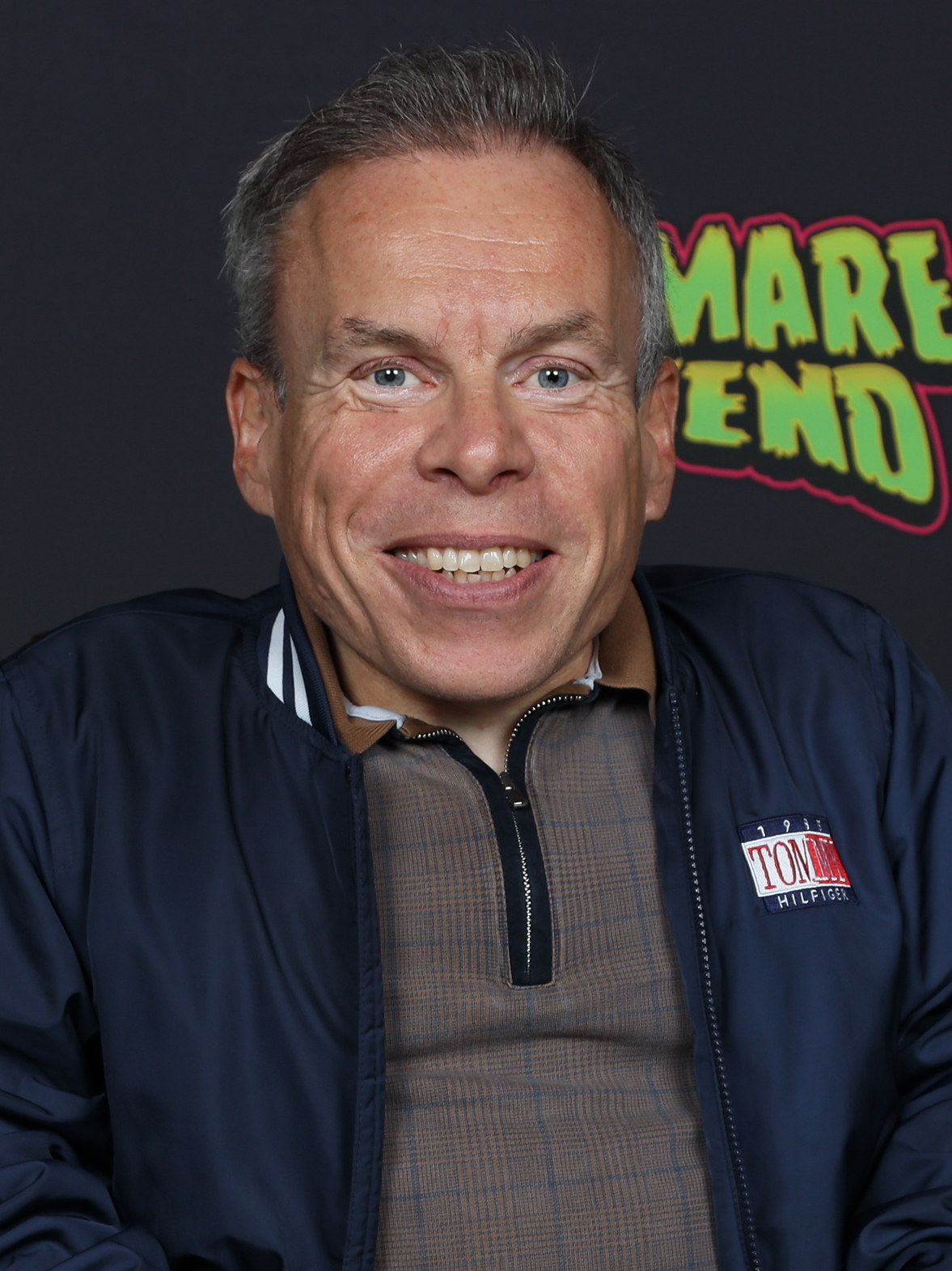
New cast members include Ian McDiarmid (left, pictured in 2020) as the Emperor, and Warwick Davis (in 2023) as Wicket the Ewok.

Alan Webb was originally cast as the Emperor, but dropped out due to illness. Lindsay Anderson was offered the role, but turned it down due to scheduling conflicts. Ben Kingsley and David Suchet were also considered. Alan Rickman auditioned for the role of Moff Jerjerrod, but Michael Pennington was cast instead. Marquand initially wanted a famous actor such as Laurence Olivier or John Gielgud to play the unmasked Vader, but Lucas was concerned that such an actor would be distracting for audiences. Kenny Baker was cast as Wicket the Ewok, but he fell ill with food poisoning on the day of the shoot. He was replaced by Warwick Davis, who had no film acting experience.

=== Filming ===
Filming began on January 11, 1982, and lasted through May 20, 1982, a schedule six weeks shorter than Empire. Kazanjian's schedule pushed shooting as early as possible to give Industrial Light & Magic (ILM) as much time as possible to work on effects, which left some crew members doubtful of their ability to be fully prepared. Working on a budget of $32.5 million, Lucas was determined to avoid going over budget as had happened with Empire. Kazanjian estimated that using ILM (which was owned by Lucasfilm) for special effects saved the production approximately $18 million. However, the fact that Lucasfilm was a non-union company made acquiring shooting locations more difficult and more expensive, even though Star Wars and Empire had been big hits. The production of Jedi was given the ruse title Blue Harvest with a tagline of "Horror Beyond Imagination." This disguised the production from fans and the press, and prevented price gouging by service providers.

The first stage of production spanned 78 days at Elstree Studios in England, where the film occupied all nine sound stages. The shoot commenced with a scene that was later cut from the film, in which the heroes get caught in a sandstorm as they leave Tatooine. (Note: The sandstorm scene was the only major sequence cut from the film during editing.) For the rancor, Lucas wanted to use a stunt performer in a suit in the style of the Toho Godzilla films. The production team made several attempts, but were unable to create an adequate result. Lucas eventually relented and made the rancor a puppet filmed at high speeds.

In April, the crew moved to Arizona's Yuma Desert for two weeks of Tatooine exteriors. Production then moved to northern California, where the crew shot Endor forest scenes in Grizzly Creek Redwoods State Park on private land near Smith River. Principal photography concluded with about ten days of bluescreen shots at ILM in San Rafael, California. One small post-production unit shot background matte plates for a day in Death Valley, and a Steadicam unit shot forest backgrounds for the speeder chase on Endor. Garrett Brown, the inventor of the Steadicam, personally filmed the forest shots at less than one frame per second. By walking at about 5 mph (8 km/h) and projecting the footage at 24 frames per second, the motion seen in the film appeared as if it were moving at around 120 mph (190 km/h). For long-distance shots of the chase, puppets replaced the actors. Vader's funeral was filmed at Skywalker Ranch.

Marquand and Anthony Daniels clashed on set, which led Daniels to record his dialogue with Lucas instead. Fisher also disliked working with Marquand. He often yelled at her, which caused her to burst into tears on one occasion. The tears ruined her makeup so thoroughly that it took an hour to reapply it.

=== Post-production ===
Lucasfilm encountered problems when it tested the film in a commercial theater. Lucas and his employees could not hear many of the sound effects they had mixed. To make matters worse, the background noise in the theater muffled the majority of the film's sound, which played through the theater's normal commercial sound system. Many theaters at the time had poor room acoustics with mono sound. Lucas would later solve this problem by founding a cinema audio certification company, THX, and ensuring that all theaters playing his films used a sound system that THX developed.

Meanwhile, special effects work at ILM quickly stretched the company to its operational limits. While the experience gained from the previous two films allowed for increased efficiency, this was offset by the desire to have the closing film raise the bar set by each of these films. A compounding factor was the intention of several departments of ILM to either take on other film work or decrease staff during slow cycles. Instead, as soon as production began, the entire company found it necessary to remain running 20 hours a day on six-day weeks in order to meet its goals by April 1, 1983. In total, ILM created about 900 special effects shots for Return of the Jedi.

== Music ==
John Williams composed the film's musical score and performed it with the London Symphony Orchestra. Orchestration credits also include Thomas Newman. The initial release of the film's soundtrack was on the RSO Records label in the United States. In 2004, Sony Classical Records acquired the rights to both the original trilogy scores and to the soundtracks for the prequel films The Phantom Menace and Attack of the Clones. In the same year, Sony Classical re-pressed the 1997 RCA Victor release of Return of the Jedi along with the other two films in the trilogy. This set was released with new artwork mirroring the first DVD release of the film. Despite the digital re-mastering, which minimally improved the sound heard only on high-end stereos, the 2004 release has been described as essentially the same as the 1997 RCA Victor release.

== Release ==
Return of the Jedi was released on May 25, 1983. It was originally slated to open on May 27, but was subsequently changed to coincide with the date of the 1977 release of the original Star Wars film. It was the first film to be presented with Lucasfilm's new THX sound system, with four theaters in the U.S. utilizing the system. With a massive worldwide marketing campaign, illustrator Tim Reamer created the image for the theatrical poster and other advertising. At the time of its release, the film was advertised on posters and merchandise as simply Star Wars: Return of the Jedi, despite its on-screen "Episode VI" distinction. The film was re-released in 1985.

=== Title change ===
Teaser poster for the film with the scrapped title Revenge of the Jedi

The original teaser trailer for the film carried the name Revenge of the Jedi. In December 1982, Lucas decided the word "Revenge" was not appropriate because he believed a Jedi should never seek revenge. He returned the film to its original title, but by that time thousands of "Revenge" teaser posters had been printed and distributed. Lucasfilm stopped the shipping of the posters and sold the remaining stock of 6,800 posters to Star Wars fan club members for $9.50.

=== Box office ===
Return of the Jedi grossed $314.3 million in the United States and Canada, and $166 million in other territories, for a worldwide total of $480 million (equivalent to $1.3 billion in 2025), against a production budget of about $32.5 million ($88.2 million in 2025).

Return of the Jedi earned a total of $6.2 million on its opening day, beating out Star Trek II: The Wrath of Khan to have the highest single-day gross in history. It would hold the record for having the highest pre-Memorial Day Wednesday gross until 1996 when Mission: Impossible surpassed it. Return of the Jedi made $23 million from 1,002 theaters in its opening weekend and grossed a record $45.3 million in its opening week. It also set a new domestic opening weekend record, surpassing the $14 million opening of The Wrath of Khan. Its $22,973 per theatre average would stand as a record for a nationwide release on an inflation-adjusted basis for 36 years, until it was surpassed by Avengers: Endgame in 2019. Return of the Jedi finished first at the box office for six of its first seven weeks of release. Box Office Mojo estimates that the film sold over 80 million tickets in the U.S. in its initial theatrical run. When the film was re-released in 1985, it grossed $11.2 million, bringing its initial theatrical gross to $385.8 million worldwide. During its re-release in 1997, Jedi grossed $16.29 million in its opening weekend. When it was re-released in 2023 for its 40th anniversary, it grossed $5.1 million, placing fourth at the weekend box office.

== Reception ==
=== Critical response ===
The Chicago Sun-Times film critic Roger Ebert gave Return of the Jedi four out of four stars, calling it "a complete entertainment, a feast for the eyes and a delight for the fancy." He said that Lucas and his team "keep topping themselves." Gene Siskel of the Chicago Tribune also gave the film his highest possible rating, calling it a "childlike delight" which features "every facet of filmmaking at its best." Writing in The Washington Post, Gary Arnold called Return of the Jedi a "feat of mass enchantment" and "an imposing landmark in contemporary popular culture". Colin Greenland of Imagine magazine stated, "You would think a series like Star Wars, fuelled by public adoration, coasting along on the hyperdrive of its own hyperboles, would get inexorably worse. It is not. It is getting better."

Sheila Benson of the Los Angeles Times wrote that the film is fully satisfying, overflows with "new inventiveness", and carries "a weight and a new maturity" without becoming any less fun than the previous films. She likened the characters in Return of the Jedi to close friends which the viewer must leave behind as the trilogy ends. Writing for Time magazine, Gerald Clarke described Jedi as better and more satisfying than The Empire Strikes Back, but less exciting than Star Wars. James Harwood of Variety called the film a "visual treat" featuring an impressive array of creatures, but felt that Mark Hamill was not a skilled enough dramatic actor to carry the plot, and that Carrie Fisher and Billy Dee Williams did not perform as well as in previous films. He thought Harrison Ford was not given enough to do.

The film received negative reviews, as well. Vincent Canby of The New York Times called Return of the Jedi the "dimmest adventure" of the trilogy. Pauline Kael of The New Yorker felt the film's imagery was lackluster, and called it "an impersonal and rather junky piece of moviemaking." In his review for Ares magazine, Christopher John called Jedi a failure and "a cheap and tarnished crown for the series which shook the world of film when it started out".

=== Accolades ===
Award	Category	Nominees	Result
Academy Awards	Best Art Direction	Norman Reynolds, Fred Hole, James L. Schoppe and Michael D. Ford	Nominated
Academy Awards	Best Original Score	John Williams	Nominated
Academy Awards	Best Sound Effects Editing	Ben Burtt	Nominated
Academy Awards	Best Sound	Ben Burtt, Gary Summers, Randy Thom and Tony Dawe	Nominated
Academy Awards	Special Achievement Academy Award for Visual Effects	Richard Edlund, Dennis Muren, Ken Ralston and Phil Tippett	Won
British Academy Film Awards	Best Makeup and Hair	Phil Tippett and Stuart Freeborn	Nominated
British Academy Film Awards	Best Production Design	Norman Reynolds	Nominated
British Academy Film Awards	Best Sound	Ben Burtt, Gary Summers and Tony Dawe	Nominated
British Academy Film Awards	Best Special Visual Effects	Richard Edlund, Dennis Muren, Ken Ralston and Kit West	Won
British Academy Film Awards	Best Album of Original Score Written for a Motion Picture or Television Special	John Williams	Nominated
Hugo Awards	Best Dramatic Presentation	Richard Marquand, Lawrence Kasdan and George Lucas	Won
Saturn Awards	Best Science Fiction Film	Howard Kazanjian	Won
Saturn Awards	Best Director	Richard Marquand	Nominated
Saturn Awards	Best Actor	Mark Hamill	Won
Saturn Awards	Best Actress	Carrie Fisher	Nominated
Saturn Awards	Best Supporting Actor	Billy Dee Williams	Nominated
Saturn Awards	Best Writing	Lawrence Kasdan and George Lucas	Nominated
Saturn Awards	Best Costume Design	Aggie Guerard Rodgers and Nilo Rodis-Jamero	Won
Saturn Awards	Best Make-up	Phil Tippett and Stuart Freeborn	Won
Saturn Awards	Best Music	John Williams	Nominated
Saturn Awards	Best Special Effects	Richard Edlund, Dennis Muren and Ken Ralston	Won

In 2021, Return of the Jedi was selected for preservation in the United States National Film Registry by the Library of Congress for being "culturally, historically, or aesthetically significant".

== Post-release ==
=== Re-releases ===
In 1997, for the 20th anniversary of the release of Star Wars, Lucasfilm released the Star Wars Trilogy: Special Edition in theaters. All three films in the original trilogy contained changes and additions in the Special Edition. Changes in Return of the Jedi include the addition of several new aliens in Jabba's throne room, a different song performed in the throne room, the addition of a beak to the Sarlacc, the insertion of various worlds celebrating the fall of the Empire, and different music during the closing scene. The runtime of the Special Edition—and all subsequent releases of Return of the Jedi—is approximately five minutes longer than the original theatrical version.

Return of the Jedi was re-released theatrically by 20th Century Studios on April 28, 2023, to commemorate the film's 40th anniversary.

=== Home media ===
The 1997 theatrical release poster of the Special Edition version of Return of the Jedi An editor has nominated the above file for discussion of its purpose and/or potential deletion. You are welcome to participate in the discussion and help reach a consensus.

The original theatrical version of Return of the Jedi was released on VHS and LaserDisc several times between 1986 and 1995. The Special Edition was published on VHS and LaserDisc between 1997 and 2000. Some of these releases contained featurettes.

In September 2004, the original Star Wars trilogy was released in a boxed set on DVD with digital restoration and new alterations made by Lucas. (Note: The DVD features Dolby Digital 5.1 EX surround sound and commentaries by George Lucas, Ben Burtt, Dennis Muren, and Carrie Fisher. The bonus disc included documentaries including Empire of Dreams: The Story of the Star Wars Trilogy and several featurettes including "The Characters of Star Wars", "The Birth of the Lightsaber", and "The Legacy of Star Wars". Also included were teasers, trailers, TV spots, still galleries, and a demo for Star Wars: Battlefront.) In this version of Return of the Jedi, Hayden Christensen was inserted into the final scene as Anakin's Force spirit, replacing Sebastian Shaw; Christensen portrays Anakin in Attack of the Clones and Revenge of the Sith. All three films of the trilogy were released individually on Limited Edition DVDs in 2006, with the original unaltered versions included as bonus features. These were collected in a boxed set on November 4, 2008.

In September 2011, all the films of the original trilogy and the prequel trilogy were released together on Blu-ray by 20th Century-Fox Home Entertainment. The version of Return of the Jedi in this set contained some new changes, including Ewoks blinking and Vader yelling "No!" as he throws the Emperor to his death, an alteration which drew sharp negative criticism. Several deleted scenes from the film were included as special features, including a scene in which Vader communicates with Luke using the Force, a sandstorm sequence following the Sarlacc pit rescue, and a scene featuring Imperial officers during the Battle of Endor.

In April 2015, all six films from the two existing trilogies were released digitally through the iTunes Store, Amazon Video, Vudu, Google Play, and Disney Movies Anywhere. Walt Disney Studios Home Entertainment reissued Return of the Jedi on Blu-ray, DVD, and digital download in September 2019. Additionally, all six films were made available for 4K resolution HDR and Dolby Atmos streaming on Disney+ upon the service's launch in November 2019. The Disney+ version of Return of the Jedi was released on 4K Ultra HD Blu-ray in March 2020.

== Legacy ==
According to the review aggregator website Rotten Tomatoes, 84% of critics have given the film a positive review with an average rating of 7.30/10, based on 169 reviews from critics. The website's critics consensus reads: "Though failing to reach the cinematic heights of its predecessors, Return of the Jedi remains an entertaining sci-fi adventure and a fitting end to the classic trilogy." At Metacritic, the film has a weighted average score of 58 out of 100 based on 24 reviews from mainstream critics, indicating "mixed or average reviews". Audiences polled by CinemaScore gave the film a rare average grade of "A+" on an A+ to F scale.

In his review of the 1997 Special Edition re-release, the film critic James Kendrick called Return of the Jedi the weakest of the three original films, saying it depended "too much on the slick commercialism" of the franchise but that it was still "a magnificent experience in its own right". James Berardinelli described it as the least enjoyable and least innovative film of the trilogy. He felt that the Special Edition was not saved by the alterations, but that it was nevertheless a "must-see" for fans as the conclusion of the trilogy.

Some fans have questioned the realism of the scene in Jedi in which the small Ewoks capably fight with primitive weapons against Imperial troops. Lucas has defended the scene, saying that the Ewoks' purpose was to distract the Imperial troops, and they did not really win. The Ewok battle scene was inspired by the Vietnam War, during which the Viet Cong prevailed against the technologically superior United States.

== Marketing ==
=== Novelization ===
The novelization of Return of the Jedi was written by James Kahn and was released on May 12, 1983, thirteen days before the film's release.

=== Radio drama ===
A three-hour radio drama adaptation of the film was written by Brian Daley with additional material contributed by John Whitman. It was broadcast on National Public Radio in 1996, over a decade after the radio adaptations of the first two Star Wars films. Anthony Daniels reprised his role as C-3PO, but Mark Hamill and Billy Dee Williams were replaced by Joshua Fardon and Arye Gross, respectively. Bernard Behrens and Brock Peters reprised their roles as Obi-Wan Kenobi and Darth Vader, respectively. John Lithgow voiced Yoda, and Ed Begley, Jr. played Boba Fett. Ed Asner voiced Jabba the Hutt, speaking only in grunts.

=== Comic book adaptation ===
Marvel Comics published a comic book adaptation of Return of the Jedi by writer Archie Goodwin and artists Al Williamson, Carlos Garzon, Tom Palmer, and Ron Frenz. The adaptation appeared in Marvel Super Special #27 and as a four-issue limited series. It was later reprinted in a mass market paperback, as well as in collections of Marvel's Star Wars series. Marvel Super Special #27 was mistakenly released in April 1983, a month before the film, giving away the film's plot. Hamill discovered the comic at a store and alerted Lucasfilm, which led Marvel to recall the comic.

=== Book-and-record set ===
Lucasfilm adapted the plot of the film for a children's book-and-record set. Released in 1983, the 24-page Star Wars: Return of the Jedi read-along book was accompanied by a 33 1/3 rpm 18-centimetre (7 in) gramophone record. Each page of the book contained a cropped frame from the film with an abridged and condensed version of the story. The record was produced by Buena Vista Records.

== Prequels and sequels ==
Sixteen years after the release of Return of the Jedi, Lucas wrote and directed a prequel trilogy, consisting of the films The Phantom Menace, Attack of the Clones, and Revenge of the Sith. The films chronicle the history between Obi-Wan Kenobi and Anakin Skywalker, and Anakin's fall to the darkside and transformation into Darth Vader. The prequel trilogy was financially successful, but polarized critics and fans. (Note: Attributed to multiple sources:)

After Lucas sold the Star Wars franchise to the Walt Disney Company in 2012, Disney developed a sequel trilogy, consisting of The Force Awakens, The Last Jedi, and The Rise of Skywalker. (Note: Attributed to multiple sources:) Harrison Ford, Mark Hamill, Carrie Fisher and other cast members from the original trilogy reprised their roles, alongside new characters portrayed by Daisy Ridley, John Boyega, Adam Driver, and Oscar Isaac. Standalone films and television series have also been released, exploring adventures set around the main trilogy arcs. The Disney+ streaming series The Book of Boba Fett, Ahsoka and The Mandalorian are set a few years after Return of the Jedi, bridging the time period between that film and The Force Awakens.

== Works cited ==
- Arnold, Alan (1980). Once Upon a Galaxy: A Journal of Making the Empire Strikes Back. London: Sphere Books. ISBN 978-0-345-29075-5.
- Daniels, Anthony (2019). I Am C-3PO: The Inside Story (Hardback ed.). London: DK. ISBN 9780241357606.
- Hidalgo, Pablo; Sansweet, Stephen (2008). The Complete Star Wars Encyclopedia. Vol. III (First ed.). New York: Del Rey. ISBN 9780345477637.
- Rinzler, J.W. (2013). The Making of Return of the Jedi. New York: Del Rey. ISBN 978-0-345-51146-1.
- Return of the Jedi archive review: George Lucas quits on top. Sight & Sound. December 18, 2019.
