= Mike Edmonds =

British actor

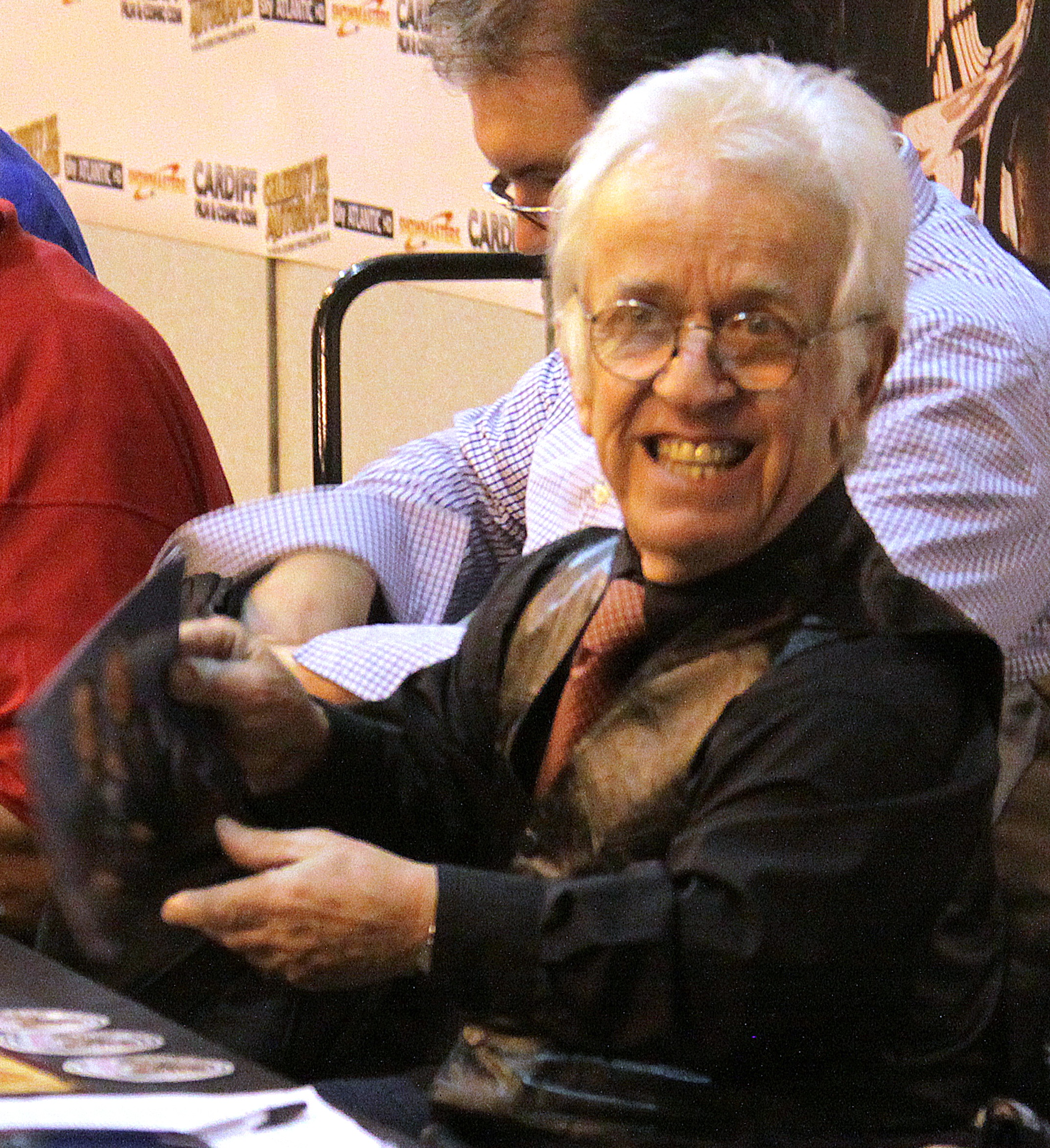
- Edmonds at Cardiff Comic Con 2014
- Born: 13 January 1944 (age 82); Chelmsford, Essex, England
- Occupation: Actor
- Years active: 1975–present
- Height: 132 cm (4 ft 4 in)

Mike Edmonds (born 13 January 1944) is an English actor with achondroplasia (dwarfism), known for his role as Little Ron in the children's television show Maid Marian and Her Merry Men.

Edmonds has appeared in several films, including Flash Gordon (1980), The Dark Crystal (1982), and Who Framed Roger Rabbit (1988). He played the role of Og in the Terry Gilliam film Time Bandits (1981). In Return of the Jedi, (1983) he performed as the Ewok Logray as well as the operator for Jabba the Hutt's tail.

Edmonds can be seen dancing in the Men Without Hats music video "The Safety Dance" as a dwarf jester, wearing a shirt for their debut studio album Rhythm of Youth (1982).

With the death of Malcolm Dixon in 2020, Edmonds became the last surviving actor to have played one of the titular "Time Bandits".

== Filmography ==
- Black Jack (1979) – Tom Thumb's Army
- Flash Gordon (1980) – Dwarf
- The Empire Strikes Back (1980) – Ugnaught (uncredited)
- Time Bandits (1981) – Og
- The Dark Crystal (1982) – Aughra
- I Remember Nelson (1982) - Portrait Seller
- Philip Marlowe, Private Eye (1983) - Page Boy
- Safety Dance (music video), Men Without Hats (1983) Jester
- St Ursula's In Danger (1983) - Gypsy
- Return of the Jedi (1983) – Logray (Ewok)
- Cell 151 (music video), Steve Hackett (1983) - Dream Apparition
- Sword of the Valiant (1984) – Tiny Man
- The Master of Ballantrae (1984) - Pirate
- They Came From Somewhere Else (1984) - Dwarf
- Legend (1985) – Tic (uncredited)
- Lost Empires (1986) - Barney
- Treasures of the Mindlord (1986) - To-lor
- Snow White (1987) – Biddy
- Salome's Last Dance (1988) – 1st Jew
- Who Framed Roger Rabbit (1988) – Stretch
- The Storyteller (1988) - Tiny Tailor
- Maid Marian and Her Merry Men (1989–1994) – Little Ron
- The Silver Chair (1990) - Second Owl
- Preacher Man (music video, Bananarama (1990) - Shaman
- The 10th Kingdom (2000) - Dwarf Librarian
- Fun at the Funeral Parlour (2001) - Pablo
- Harry Potter and the Philosopher's Stone (2001) – Goblin (uncredited)
- Starhyke (2009) - Logan
- Harry Potter and the Deathly Hallows Part 2 (2011) – Goblin (uncredited)
- An Accidental Studio (2019) - Self
- Under the Radar: The Mike Edmonds Story (2019) - Self
