= Stuart Freeborn =

English make-up artist (1914–2013)

- Born: 5 September 1914; Leytonstone, Essex (now London), England
- Died: 5 February 2013 (aged 98); London, England
- Occupation: Make-up artist
- Known for: Star Wars
- Spouse: Kay (3 children)

Stuart Freeborn (5 September 1914 – 5 February 2013) was a British motion picture make-up artist. He has been referred to as the "grandfather of modern make-up design" and is perhaps best known for his work on the original Star Wars trilogy, most notably the design and fabrication of Yoda.

== Career ==
"Stuart was already a makeup legend when he started on Star Wars. He brought with him not only decades of experience, but boundless creative energy. His artistry and craftsmanship will live on forever in the characters he created. His Star Wars creatures may be reinterpreted in new forms by new generations, but at their heart, they continue to be what Stuart created for the original films."

— Star Wars creator George Lucas.

Freeborn's earliest work in the film industry was designing the controversial hair and make-up worn by Alec Guinness, as Fagin, in Oliver Twist. Freeborn's most famous work is creating the make-up for all of the characters in the Star Wars trilogy, including Chewbacca and Yoda; he based Yoda on his own face and partly on Albert Einstein. He oversaw the design of the original Jabba the Hutt puppet used in Return of the Jedi as well as the creation of the Ewoks.

Freeborn was also the make-up artist on Stanley Kubrick's 2001: A Space Odyssey, where he created the humans/apes for the "Dawn of Man" sequence. He worked on Kubrick's Dr. Strangelove, handling Peter Sellers' multiple lead roles. He also worked with Sellers in several other films, including Heavens Above!, Mr. Topaze, The Mouse that Roared, and Soft Beds, Hard Battles, and also was the make-up visual supervisor in the Superman films.

His wife Kay assisted her husband on several occasions; their son Graham was also a prolific make-up artist before his death in 1986.

In the Star Wars: Episode I – The Phantom Menace DVD, in one of the web documentaries, he was awarded a statue by the team at Lucasfilm.

== Personal life ==
Freeborn died on 5 February 2013 at the age of 98 in London. His wife Kay died in 2012. Freeborn's three sons—Roger, Ray and Graham—also predeceased him. Freeborn had eight grandchildren and several great-grandchildren.

== Selected filmography ==
- The Thief of Bagdad (1940, uncredited makeup artist)
- Oliver Twist (1948, makeup artist – as Stuart Freebourne)
- The Bridge on the River Kwai (1957, makeup artist)
- A King in New York (1957, makeup artist)
- Dr. Strangelove (1964, makeup artist – as Stewart Freeborn)
- 2001: A Space Odyssey (1968, makeup)
- Alice's Adventures in Wonderland (1972, makeup artist)
- The Omen (1976, chief makeup artist)
- Star Wars
  - Star Wars Episode IV: A New Hope (1977, makeup supervisor and uncredited creature design supervisor)
  - The Empire Strikes Back (1980, makeup and special creature designer)
  - Return of the Jedi (1983, makeup designer and creature design)
- Superman
  - Superman (1978, creative supervisor of makeup & special visuals)
  - Superman II (1980, makeup artist)
  - Superman III (1983, makeup artist)
  - Superman IV: The Quest for Peace (1987, makeup supervisor)
