= David Barclay (puppeteer) =

British puppeteer

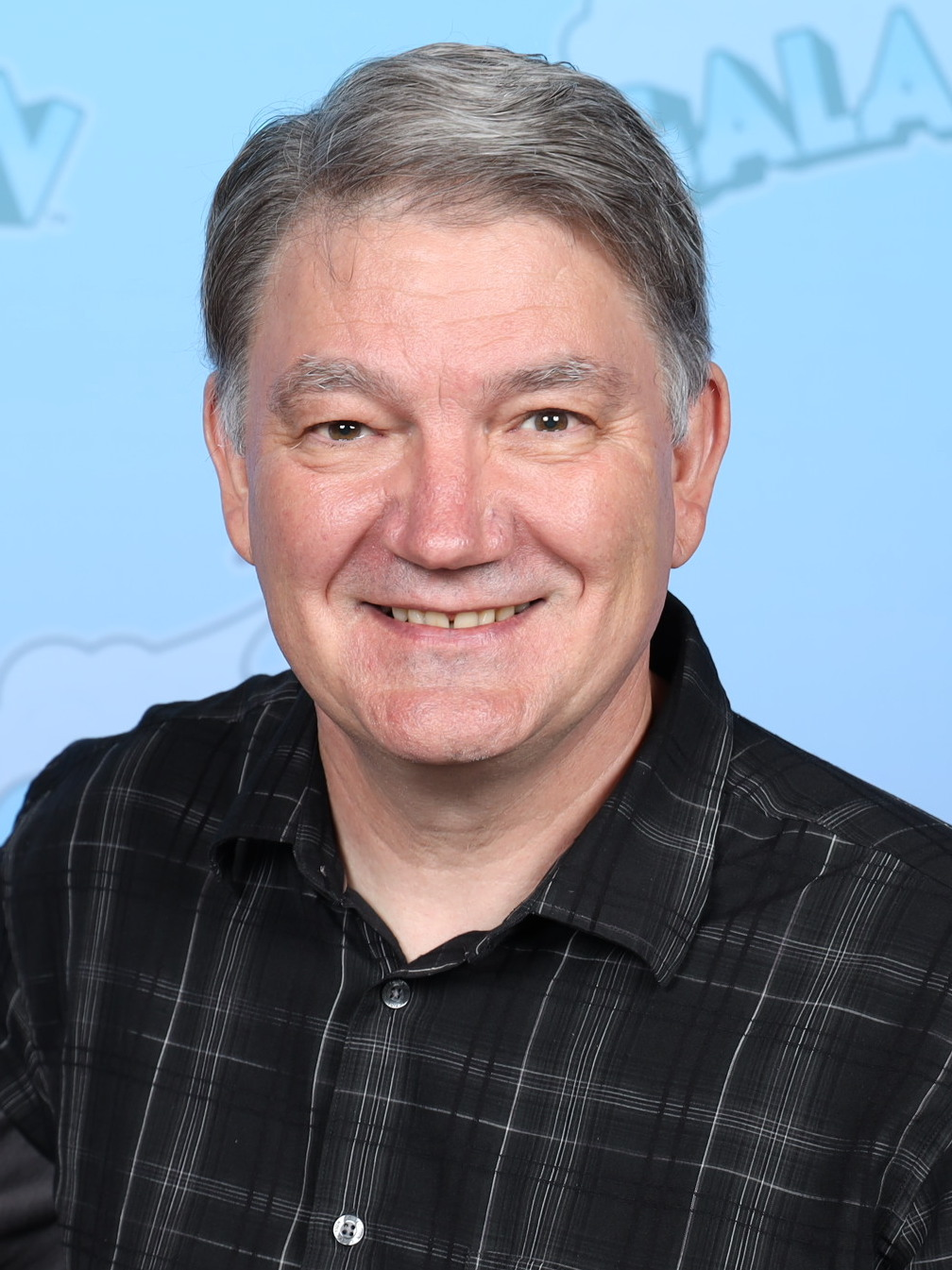
- Barclay at GalaxyCon Raleigh in 2023
- Born: David Alan Barclay
- Occupation: Puppeteer
- Years active: 1979–present

David Alan Barclay is a British puppeteer who had worked on some projects of The Jim Henson Company. He has been at the cutting edge of animatronic puppetry since 1979. Barclay, who hails from London, is a Master Puppeteer, Animatronic Designer and Supervisor, a CG key frame Animator, and Director and Producer of animatronic and animation projects for film and television.

== Biography ==
Barclay was born to a Scottish mother and an English father. At age four, he performed marionettes, glove and rod puppets with his parents, Ann and Michael who formed Pex Puppet Theatre focusing their acting talents on live puppetry. When he was seven, Barclay performed traditional Punch and Judy at the British Puppet Guild, for documentary cameras. Throughout his childhood, he designed built and performed dozens of his own puppets and continued performing Punch and Judy into his late teens. He worked for other live puppet companies, Jactito, directors James and Joan Barton, and Cap and Bells, director Violet Philpott. His first work in front of camera was a brief appearance as a large dog in the British classic comedy series The Morecambe and Wise Christmas Show. This was in 1978 for Thames TV. In July 1979 he was offered the position of make up assistant working for Stuart Freeborn on the second Star Wars film The Empire Strikes Back. The main challenge was a state-of-the-art hand puppet named Yoda, and Barclay assisted building duplicate parts, seaming the foam latex head skins, etc., but when assistant puppeteer Wendy Midener Froud became allergic to something on the set, he was drafted in as a puppeteer. Dave performed the cable controlled facial movements for Muppet master Frank Oz, the chief puppeteer. When Oz had to return to New York City to shoot Sesame Street, as the production had run over, Oz nominated Barclay to take over as chief puppeteer for Yoda. Barclay was then invited to become the first British puppet maker on a new adventurous project by Jim Henson and Frank Oz, The Dark Crystal. In November 1979, he joined a handful of Henson's American puppet makers, to develop puppets that would finally become the entire cast of the movie. And so started the long-term relationship and desire to push the envelope in animatronic performance art.

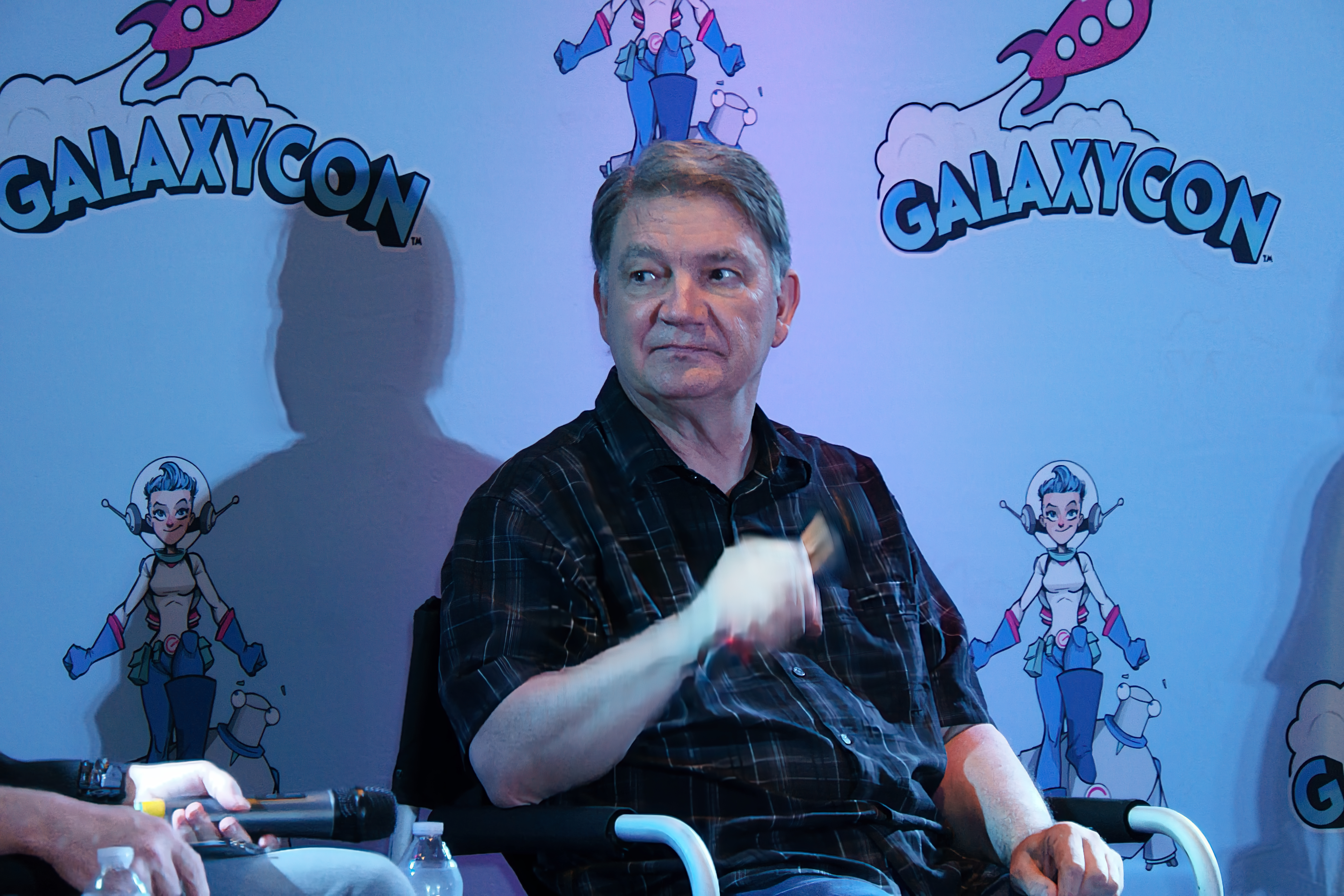
Dave Barclay at Galaxy Con Raleigh 2023

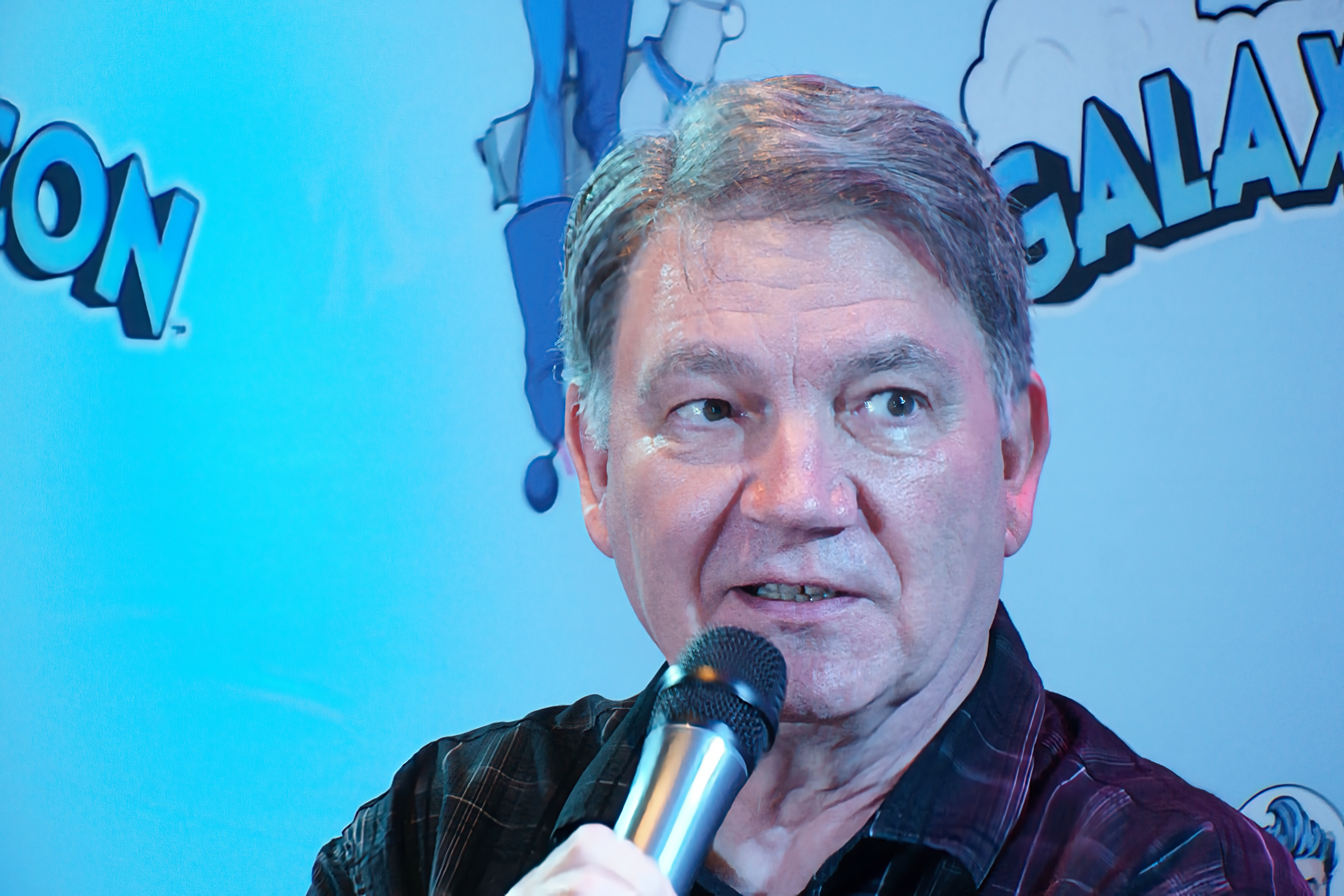
Dave Barclay at Galaxy Con Raleigh 2023

== Filmography ==
- Alice in Wonderland - The Dormouse (puppeteer), Gryphon (puppeteer)
- Are We There Yet? - Satchel Paige Bobblehead
- Labyrinth - Didymus (puppeteer), Firey 1 (puppeteer)
- Snow Dogs - Demon (animatronic performer)
- Return of the Jedi - Jabba the Hutt (puppeteer)
- The Muppet Christmas Carol - Additional Muppet Performer
- The Muppets - Additional Muppet Performer
- The Odyssey - Polyphemus (face performer)

=== Television ===
- Studio DC: Almost Live - Additional Muppets
- Fraggle Rock - Sprocket (British German and French versions), Travelling Matt (French and German versions)
- The Storyteller - Devil ("The Storyteller and Death," puppeteer)

=== Events ===
- The Muppets Take the Bowl - Additional Muppet Performer (Live show at the Hollywood Bowl, Sept. 8–10, 2017)
- The Muppets Take the O2 - Additional Muppet Performer (Live show at the O2 Arena, Jul. 13–14, 2018)

== Crew work ==
- Cats & Dogs - Animatronics Effects Supervisor, Lead Performance Coordinator
- Cats & Dogs: The Revenge of Kitty Galore - Animatronics Effects Supervisor, Puppeteer
- Dreamchild - Puppet Maker
- Little Shop of Horrors - Principal Plant Performer
- Looney Tunes: Back in Action - Puppeteer, Technical Consultant
- Lost in Space - "Blawp" Animation Unit
- Scooby-Doo! The Mystery Begins - Digital Puppeteer
- The Empire Strikes Back - Assistant Puppeteer
- Stuart Little 2 - Animatronics Supervisor
- Team America: World Police - Puppeteer
- The Flintstones in Viva Rock Vegas - Chief Puppeteer
- The NeverEnding Story III' - Key Puppeteer
- Where the Wild Things Are - Puppeteer
- Who Framed Roger Rabbit - Chief Puppeteer
- Coyote vs. Acme - Puppeteer
