= List of The Muppets productions =

This is a list of productions based on The Muppets characters and franchise, including films, television series and specials, and other media. The franchise's main work is The Muppet Show, a syndicated television series which ran from 1976 to 1981. The franchise includes eight feature films, and other television series.

== Films ==
Role	The Muppet Movie (1979)	The Great Muppet Caper (1981)	The Muppets Take Manhattan (1984)	The Muppet Christmas Carol (1992)	Muppet Treasure Island (1996)	Muppets from Space (1999)	The Muppets (2011)	Muppets Most Wanted (2014)
Director	James Frawley	Jim Henson	Frank Oz	Brian Henson	Brian Henson	Tim Hill	James Bobin	James Bobin
Producer(s)	Jim Henson	David Lazer and Frank Oz	David Lazer	Brian Henson and Martin G. Baker	Brian Henson and Martin G. Baker	Brian Henson and Martin G. Baker	David Hoberman and Todd Lieberman	David Hoberman and Todd Lieberman
Writer(s)	Jerry Juhl & Jack Burns	Tom Patchett & Jay Tarses and Jerry Juhl & Jack Rose	Frank Oz and Tom Patchett & Jay Tarses	Jerry Juhl	Jerry Juhl & Kirk R. Thatcher and James V. Hart	Jerry Juhl and Joseph Mazzarino and Ken Kaufman	Jason Segel & Nicholas Stoller	James Bobin & Nicholas Stoller
Composer(s)	Paul Williams and Kenneth Ascher	Joe Raposo	Ralph Burns	Miles Goodman	Hans Zimmer	Jamshied Sharifi	Christophe Beck	Christophe Beck
Production companies	ITC Entertainment; Henson Associates	ITC Entertainment; Henson Associates	Henson Associates	Walt Disney Pictures; Jim Henson Productions	Walt Disney Pictures; Jim Henson Productions	Columbia Pictures; Jim Henson Pictures	Walt Disney Pictures; Mandeville Films	Walt Disney Pictures; Mandeville Films
Distribution	Universal Pictures^{1} Associated Film Distribution^{1}		TriStar Pictures	Buena Vista Pictures Distribution	Buena Vista Pictures Distribution	Sony Pictures Releasing	Walt Disney Studios Motion Pictures	Walt Disney Studios Motion Pictures
Running time	95 minutes	98 minutes	94 minutes	86 minutes	99 minutes	88 minutes	103 minutes	107 minutes
Release date	June 22, 1979	June 26, 1981	July 13, 1984	December 11, 1992	February 16, 1996	July 14, 1999	November 23, 2011	March 21, 2014
Box office $458,718,791	$65,810,475	$31,206,251	$25,534,703	$27,330,071	$34,327,391	$22,323,612	$171,802,998	$80,383,290
Rotten Tomatoes	89%	75%	84%	78%	80%	63%	95%	80%

== Television ==
=== Series ===
Title	Premiere date	End date	Network
Sam and Friends	May 9, 1955	December 15, 1961	NBC (WRC-TV)
The Muppet Show	September 5, 1976	May 23, 1981	ITV/Syndication
Little Muppet Monsters	September 14, 1985	September 28, 1985	CBS
The Jim Henson Hour	April 14, 1989	July 30, 1989	NBC
Muppets Tonight	March 8, 1996	February 8, 1998	ABC / Disney Channel
Muppets TV	October 29, 2006	December 31, 2006	TF1
Muppet Moments	April 3, 2015	November 28, 2015	Disney Junior / Disney Channel
The Muppets	September 22, 2015	March 1, 2016	ABC
Muppets Now	July 31, 2020	September 4, 2020	Disney+
The Muppets Mayhem	May 10, 2023		Disney+

=== Animated series ===
Title	Premiere date	End date	Network
Muppet Babies	September 15, 1984	November 2, 1991	CBS
Dog City	September 26, 1992	November 26, 1994	Fox Kids
Muppet Babies	March 23, 2018	February 18, 2022	Disney Junior

=== Television films ===
Title	Release date	Director	Producer(s)	Network	Distributor
Kermit's Swamp Years	August 18, 2002	David Gumpel	Jim Lewis and Joseph Mazzarino	Starz	Sony Pictures Television
It's a Very Merry Muppet Christmas Movie	November 29, 2002	Kirk R. Thatcher	Martin G. Baker and Warren Carr	NBC	NBCUniversal Television Distribution; MGM Worldwide Television Group and Digital Distribution
The Muppets' Wizard of Oz	May 20, 2005	Kirk R. Thatcher	Bill Barretta	ABC	Buena Vista Television

=== Television specials ===
Title	Release date	Network
Hey, Cinderella!	March 16, 1969	ABC, CBC
The Muppets on Puppets	January 5, 1970	WNET
The Great Santa Claus Switch	December 20, 1970	CBS
The Frog Prince	May 12, 1971	Syndicated
The Muppet Musicians of Bremen	April 26, 1972	Syndicated
The Muppets Valentine Show	January 30, 1974	ABC
The Muppet Show: Sex and Violence	March 19, 1975	ABC
Emmet Otter's Jug-Band Christmas	December 4, 1977	CBC
The Muppets Go Hollywood	May 16, 1979	CBS
John Denver and the Muppets: A Christmas Together	December 5, 1979	ABC
The Muppets Go to the Movies	May 20, 1981	ABC
Of Muppets and Men	October 31, 1981	CBS
The Fantastic Miss Piggy Show	September 17, 1982	ABC
Rocky Mountain Holiday with John Denver and the Muppets	May 12, 1983	ABC
The Muppets: A Celebration of 30 Years	January 21, 1986	CBS
The Tale of the Bunny Picnic	March 26, 1986	HBO
The Christmas Toy	December 6, 1986	ABC
A Muppet Family Christmas	December 16, 1987	ABC
Disneyland's 35th Anniversary	February 6, 1990	NBC
The Muppets at Walt Disney World	May 6, 1990	NBC
The Muppets Celebrate Jim Henson	November 21, 1990	CBS
Mr. Willowby's Christmas Tree	December 6, 1995	CBS
Studio DC: Almost Live hosted by Dylan and Cole Sprouse	August 3, 2008	Disney Channel
Studio DC: Almost Live hosted by Selena Gomez	October 5, 2008	Disney Channel
A Muppets Christmas: Letters to Santa	December 17, 2008	NBC
Lady Gaga and the Muppets Holiday Spectacular	November 28, 2013	ABC
Muppets Haunted Mansion	October 8, 2021	Disney+
The Muppet Show	February 4, 2026	ABC; Disney+

=== Direct-to-video releases ===
Title	Release date	Director	Distributor
Muppet Sing Alongs: Billy Bunny's Animal Songs	May 21, 1993	David Gumpel	Buena Vista Home Video
Muppet Sing Alongs: It's Not Easy Being Green	February 18, 1994	David Gumpel	Buena Vista Home Video
Muppet Classic Theater	September 27, 1994	David Grossman	Buena Vista Home Video
Muppet Sing Alongs: Muppets On Wheels	June 16, 1995	David Gumpel	Buena Vista Home Video
Yes, I Can Learn featuring the Muppet Babies	June 16, 1995	David Gumpel	Buena Vista Home Video
Yes, I Can Help featuring the Muppet Babies	June 16, 1995	David Gumpel	Buena Vista Home Video
Yes, I Can Be a Friend featuring the Muppet Babies	August 11, 1995	David Gumpel	Buena Vista Home Video
Muppet Sing Alongs: Muppet Treasure Island	February 14, 1996	David Gumpel	Buena Vista Home Video
Muppet Sing Alongs: Things That Fly	February 14, 1996	David Gumpel	Buena Vista Home Video

== Web series ==
Title	Premiere date	End date
Statler and Waldorf: From the Balcony	June 26, 2005	September 20, 2006
The Muppets Kitchen with Cat Cora	September 13, 2010	December 17, 2010

== Video games ==
A number of video games featuring the Muppets have been produced since the 1990s.

- Muppet Adventure: Chaos at the Carnival (1990)
- Muppets Inside (1996)
- Muppet RaceMania (2000)
- Muppet Monster Adventure (2000)
- Spy Muppets: License to Croak (2003)
- Muppets Party Cruise (2003)
- My Muppets Show(2013)
- The Muppets Movie Adventures (2014)

== See also ==
- The Muppets discography
- List of Sesame Workshop productions

== Notes ==
1. Distribution rights were purchased by The Jim Henson Company from ITC Entertainment in August 1984. The rights were then acquired by Walt Disney Studios upon their parent company's acquisition of the Muppets franchise in 2004. The films have since been reissued under the Walt Disney Pictures banner for home media releases.
