= The Muppets on Puppets =

- Genre: Family film
- Created by: Jim Henson
- Written by: Jerry Juhl
- Directed by: Tim Steele
- Starring: Jim Henson; Jerry Juhl; Frank Oz
- Theme music composer: Dennis Stoner
- Country of origin: United States

Production
- Producer: Tim Steele
- Running time: 57 min.

Original release
- Network: NET (station WNET in New York City)
- Release: January 5, 1970

The Muppets on Puppets is a 1970 TV special created by Jim Henson. The special was produced in June 1968 at public television station WITF-TV in Hershey, Pennsylvania, for National Educational Television (now PBS). It aired on New York's WNET on January 5, 1970, as part of the station's Adventure in the Arts anthology series. Henson and company made three additional specials in color as part of the series at WITF-TV. The special is included as a bonus feature on the DVD set The Muppet Show: Season Three. This release includes a few audio drop-outs due to the video source.

== Plot ==
Jim Henson and Rowlf the Dog explain the arts of puppet building and puppeteering as well as describing the different type of puppets used in his performances.

== Cast ==
- Jim Henson - Himself
- Jerry Juhl - Himself
- Frank Oz - Himself
- Don Sahlin - Himself

=== Muppet performers ===
- Jim Henson - Kermit the Frog, Rowlf the Dog, King Fred, King Goshposh, Rock and Roll Monster (Middle Head), Southern Colonel, Wontkins
- Frank Oz - Beautiful Day Monster, Gretel the Cow, Little Girl Sue, Princess Gwendolynda, Right Hand of Southern Colonel, Rock and Roll Monster (Right Head), Splurge
- Jerry Juhl - Charlie, Grump, Hansel, Henrietta, Rock and Roll Monster (Left Head), Scritch the Witch, Taminella Grinderfall

== Credits ==
- Writer: Jerry Juhl
- Host: Jim Henson
- Puppeteers: Frank Oz, and Jim Henson, Jerry Juhl
- Puppet Builder: Donald Sahlin
- Piano Music: Dennis Stoner
- Historical Puppets Courtesy Of: Bil Baird and Milton Hapert
- Settings: Charles Rice
- Lighting: Bill Coss
- Technical Supervision: Larry Winemiller, John Bosak
- Producer and Director: Tim Steele
