= List of Muppets =

Characters from the Muppets franchise

The Muppets cast in The Muppet Show. Clockwise from bottom left: Gonzo • Fozzie • Robin • Lew Zealand • Uncle Deadly • Dr. Bunsen Honeydew • Waldorf • Statler • Link Hogthrob • Dr. Teeth • Beaker • Rowlf • Camilla • Scooter • Kermit • Miss Piggy • Animal • Floyd

The Muppets are an ensemble group of comedic puppet characters originally created by Jim Henson. The Muppets have appeared in multiple television series, films, and other media appearances since the 1950s. The majority of the characters listed here originated on The Muppet Show, a television series that aired from 1976 to 1981. Since then, several more characters have been introduced in other television series, as well as theatrical films.

The first Muppet characters appeared in Sam and Friends, a Washington, D.C.–based show which was broadcast from 1955 to 1961. Kermit the Frog was one of the show's regulars, and thus was one of Henson's first Muppet creations. The Muppets became a household name after their appearance in the children's television program Sesame Street (1969–present). Henson was initially reluctant to become involved with Sesame Street because he feared being pigeon-holed as a children's performer, but agreed to work on the show to further his social goals. Henson's company owned the characters created for Sesame Street until 2001, since 2001, they have instead been owned by Sesame Workshop and are now considered a separate franchise.

The characters listed here are owned by the Muppets Studio, a division of the Walt Disney Company, who acquired the characters from the Jim Henson Company in 2004.

== Main characters ==
=== Kermit the Frog ===
- Performed by Jim Henson (1955–1990), Steve Whitmire (1990–2016), Matt Vogel (2017–present)

A pragmatic frog who is the straight man protagonist and de facto leader of the Muppets. Created by Jim Henson and introduced in 1955 on Sam and Friends, Kermit, arguably Henson's best-known character, quickly became the de facto face of the franchise, including regularly appearing on Sesame Street, sometimes as a reporter. He starred on The Muppet Show, as the showrunner, responsible for managing the show's production, and has appeared in every Muppet-branded production since.

=== Miss Piggy ===
- Performed by Frank Oz (1976–2002), Eric Jacobson (2001–present)

A temperamental diva pig who is the Muppets break-out and "authentic superstar." Until 2015, she was the romantic significant other of Kermit. Authors Maryanne Fisher and Anthony Cox call Piggy "uniquely strong and feminine," but "domineering and demanding." She was designed and built by Bonnie Erickson, and debuted in a 1974 Herb Alpert television special, where she was performed by Jerry Nelson. She is one of Oz's best-known characters.

=== Fozzie Bear ===
- Performed by Frank Oz (1976–2000), Eric Jacobson (2002–present)

An insecure, stand-up comic bear introduced in The Muppet Show. Fozzie's characterization was created by Frank Oz, who performed the character from his debut in 1976 until Oz's retirement in 2000. Eric Jacobson has performed the character since then. Finch calls Fozzie "a sweetly insecure and absolutely terrible comedian." According to Oz, Fozzie is such a bad comedian that he "can't afford good joke writers, and he can't write good jokes himself." He was designed by Michael K. Frith.

=== Gonzo the Great ===
- Performed by Danny Seagren (1970), Dave Goelz (1976–present)

An eccentric, hooked-nosed creature and stunt performance enthusiast who debuted in The Great Santa Claus Switch in 1970 as the Cigar Box Frackle. A running gag is that Gonzo's species is unknown. In past Muppets films and series, he was called a "whatever" and in Muppet Babies, Gonzo was known as a weirdo. In Muppets from Space, Gonzo is shown to be an alien. He was created by Dave Goelz, who has performed Gonzo since his inception.

=== Rowlf the Dog ===
- Performed by Jim Henson (1962–1990), Bill Barretta (1996–present)

An easygoing pianist dog who first appeared in Purina Dog Chow commercials. He was designed by Jim Henson. He then appeared in The Jimmy Dean Show, as Jimmy Dean's sidekick. Following this success, Rowlf was featured alongside Kermit in the pitch reel for Sesame Street; however, he only appeared in one filmed segment during the show's first season and was never a part of the regular cast. Finch calls Rowlf "the first fully rounded character performed by Jim Henson," and also calls him "wonderfully down-to-earth, with a dry, self-deprecating sense of humor" and "a master of the double take." He was built by Don Sahlin.

=== Scooter ===
- Performed by Richard Hunt (1976–1991), David Rudman (2008–present)

The loyal stage manager and gofer of the Muppet Theatre. Richard Hunt based Scooter's voice and personality on how he remembered himself when he was younger. He was designed by Michael K. Frith. Debuted in the first season of The Muppet Show.

=== Animal ===
- Performed by Frank Oz (1975–2000), John Kennedy (2001-2003), Eric Jacobson (2002–present)

The wild, frenzied monster drummer for Dr. Teeth and the Electric Mayhem. Author Christopher Finch calls Animal "the ultimate representation of a long line of Muppets who personify unbridled appetite,"both "carnivorous beast" and "physical manifestation of pure libido." He was designed by Jim Henson and built by Dave Goelz. Debuted in The Muppet Show: Sex and Violence.

=== Pepe the King Prawn ===
- Performed by Bill Barretta (1996–present)

A scheming and sassy Latino king prawn, Pepe was introduced in Muppets Tonight, where he and Seymour would often work as elevator operators and commissary cooks. His first theatrical film appearance was in Muppets from Space. Pepe became the spokesman of restaurant chain Long John Silver's in 2002.

=== Rizzo the Rat ===
- Performed by Steve Whitmire (1980–2016), Bradley Freeman Jr. (2025–present)

Rizzo is a sly and witty brown rat from the inner city that Whitmire describes as "a sarcastic kind of New York City character," he debuted in season four of The Muppet Show.

=== Walter ===
- Performed by Peter Linz (2011-present)

A shy, soft-voiced human-like Muppet and obsessive fan of the Muppets. Introduced in the film The Muppets (2011), Walter is the younger brother of Gary (Jason Segel) in the film. Along with Gary and his girlfriend, Mary (Amy Adams), Walter assists Kermit in reuniting the Muppets as an effort to raise enough money to regain control of the Muppet Theater from oil tycoon Tex Richman (Chris Cooper). After his successful contributions to the telethon with his lauded whistling act, Walter is accepted as a member of the Muppet ensemble. Walter returns in Muppets Most Wanted (2014), where he is instrumental in discovering Constantine's intentions and in rescuing Kermit.

=== Dr. Teeth and the Electric Mayhem ===
- Dr. Teeth: Performed by Jim Henson (1975–1990), John Kennedy (1991–2003), Bill Barretta (2005–present)
- Animal: Performed by Frank Oz (1975–2000), John Kennedy (2001–2003), Eric Jacobson (2002–present)
- Floyd Pepper: Performed by Jerry Nelson (1975–2003), John Kennedy (2005–2006), Matt Vogel (2008–present)
- Janice: Performed by Fran Brill (1975), Eren Ozker (1976-1977), Richard Hunt (1977–1991), Brian Henson (2002–2003), Tyler Bunch (2005), David Rudman (2008–present)
- Zoot: Performed by Dave Goelz (1975-present)
- Lips: Performed by Steve Whitmire (1980–2016), Peter Linz (2017–present)

A rock house band consisting of six members: Dr. Teeth, the gravelly voiced leader and keyboard player of the band, Floyd Pepper, the cynical "hippie" bass player, Janice, the lead guitar player with a flower child personality, Zoot, the laid-back saxophone player, Animal, the crazed drummer, and Lips, the mumbling trumpet player, who did not appear until season five of the Muppet Show.

Other characters to perform with the Electric Mayhem on occasion were Rowlf the Dog on piano on many occasions, Rizzo on cymbals in the "Paul Simon" episode, Beaker on vocals in the "Diana Ross" episode, Scooter in The Muppet Movie, Clifford in The Muppets at Walt Disney World, and Crazy Harry as part of the band in the first episode and later.

=== Dr. Bunsen Honeydew ===
- Performed by Dave Goelz (1976–present)

An inventive yet absent-minded scientist who frequently performs science experiments and invention demonstrations that typically go awry and has an "affable cluelessness" whenever his assistant, Beaker, is a victim of these presentations. Bunsen serves as a foil for Beaker.Bunsen debuted during the first season of The Muppet Show and was joined by Beaker during the second season.

=== Beaker ===
- Performed by Richard Hunt (1977–1991), Steve Whitmire (1992–2016), David Rudman (2017–present)

A hapless lab assistant to Bunsen, who performs ill-fated experiments which often result in him becoming the victim and seriously injured. He was designed by Henson and built by Don Sahlin. Beaker debuted in the second season of The Muppet Show.

=== The Swedish Chef ===
- Performed by Jim Henson (1975–1990), David Rudman (1992), Bill Barretta (1996–present)

A non-sensical chef that speaks in mock Swedish. Based on the "standard finger puppet,"the Swedish Chef was originally a dual collaboration between Henson and Oz, who provided the hands. Oz would deliberately do unexpected things, like tossing chickens and juggling meat cleavers, that Henson would have to improvise with a reaction. He was designed by Michael K. Frith and built by Henson and Bonnie Erickson. He debuted in The Muppet Show: Sex and Violence.

=== Statler and Waldorf ===
- Statler: Performed by Richard Hunt (1976–1991), Jerry Nelson (1975, 1992–2003), Steve Whitmire (2002–2016), Peter Linz (2017–present)
- Waldorf: Performed by Jim Henson (1975–1990), Dave Goelz (1992–present)

Two elderly and grumpy gentlemen who constantly heckle the Muppets from the audience, specifically from an upper balcony box on The Muppet Show.Statler and Waldorf were named after two New York City hotels: the Statler Hilton and the Waldorf-Astoria. They were designed and built by Bonnie Erickson. They debuted in The Muppet Show: Sex and Violence.

=== Sam Eagle ===
- Performed by Frank Oz (1975–2000), Kevin Clash (2002–2003), Eric Jacobson (2005–present)

A patriotic bald eagle and the group's self-proclaimed delegator of disciplined manners and values. Critic Jordan Schildcrout describes Sam as "a cross between Uncle Sam and the bald eagle (which is the U.S. national bird and symbol) with a dash of Richard Nixon, [who] represents a conservative, nationalist Puritanism that makes him a snob and a prude." He was designed by Henson and built by Don Sahlin. Debuted in The Muppet Show: Sex and Violence.Most recently, Sam has appeared alongside Kermit, Miss Piggy, Fozzie Bear, and Gonzo in The Muppets Present...Great Moments in American History at the Magic Kingdom theme park in Orlando, Florida.

=== Camilla the Chicken ===
- Performed by Jerry Nelson (1978–2003), Alice Dinnean (2005), Matt Vogel (2008–present)

Camilla the Chicken is a hen who is Gonzo's longtime girlfriend on The Muppet Show. This chicken with hay fever was performed by veteran Muppet performer, Jerry Nelson, and is seen frequently on The Muppet Show, but also makes appearances on the various full-length Muppet movies such as The Muppets Take Manhattan where she hyperventilates after attacking a villain and needs "mouth-to-beak resuscitation," and The Muppet Movie as Gonzo's plumber girl and is in the back of the car for the whole movie. She also appeared in TV specials such as A Muppet Family Christmas where she is seduced by the turkey who was invited to the family gathering by the Swedish Chef.

On Muppet Babies, Camilla was Baby Gonzo's stuffed yellow chicken doll. She was voiced by Frank Welker, and subsequently Dave Coulier and Russi Taylor when she came to life in Gonzo's imagination.

In The Muppets' Wizard of Oz, the Tin Thing (played by Gonzo) mentions that he and Camilla are engaged, but this is never elaborated with the actual Gonzo. Camilla appears as Gonzo's business partner in the 2011 film The Muppets, where she and her chicken companions also perform "Forget You" in the big Muppet reunion show.

== Supporting characters ==
=== Uncle Deadly ===
- Performed by Jerry Nelson (1976–1979), Matt Vogel (2011–present)

Uncle Deadly is a sinister-looking, blue reptilian-like monster who lurks around the Muppet Theater. He was originally performed by Jerry Nelson on The Muppet Show. In his first full part on the show, in episode 121, he was known as "the Phantom of the Muppet Show." Although he made his first appearance alongside Vincent Price on episode 119 of The Muppet Show, Uncle Deadly did not receive his proper introduction until episode 121. One by one, the Muppets tell Kermit the Frog that they have seen a phantom, but Kermit refuses to believe them until he sees Uncle Deadly with his own eyes. Once revealed, Uncle Deadly explains that he used to perform at the Muppet Theater, where he played Othello until he was killed...by the critics. Uncle Deadly sang a handful of songs on the show, including singing a bar of "You're Just in Love" with Ethel Merman and "Sheik of Araby," and performed in the Muppet Melodrama sketches with Miss Piggy and Wayne in season three. Although he did not have a major role in any of the Henson-helmed Muppet movies, Uncle Deadly did appear in the final group scenes at the end of The Muppet Movie and The Muppets Take Manhattan. He also appeared on The Tonight Show in 1979 when Kermit hosted.

Uncle Deadly made his first appearance in over 20 years in The Muppets, in which he was performed by Matt Vogel. He and Bobo the Bear are the henchmen of oil tycoon Tex Richman (Chris Cooper), who wants to demolish the Muppet Theatre and drill for oil on the site. As Richman tries repeatedly to stop the Muppets from raising the funds to buy the theater, Deadly realizes his mistake and decides he too is a Muppet. He forces Richman off the theatre roof before he can cut the wires on the transmission tower and joins the group. Uncle Deadly is seen during the finale version of "Life's a Happy Song." Uncle Deadly later appears in Muppets Most Wanted as the organist at Miss Piggy's wedding, performed again by Vogel.

In the 2015 TV series, Uncle Deadly is Miss Piggy's wardrobe supervisor and plays a featured part in the show, a role he continues in Muppets Now and the live shows the Muppets performed at the Hollywood Bowl and the O2 Arena. On the Muppets YouTube page, Uncle Deadly is the host of its "Muppet Thought of the Week" segment where he also contributed some thoughts. He appears as the Justice of the Peace in the 2021 Halloween special Muppets Haunted Mansion.

=== Bobo the Bear ===
Bobo the Bear

- Performed by Bill Barretta (1996–present)

Bobo the Bear is an imposing yet easily amused and befuddled brown bear, though his appearance is less anthropomorphic than other animal characters such as Fozzie Bear. Bobo has been in several Muppet films as a major character and others as just a background character. One of his appearances was on Muppets Tonight as the security guard, where he was a seemingly clever and lovable character, with his tagline of "Have a good day, sir!" His character in Muppets from Space was named Rentro. The character appeared in the television special A Muppets Christmas: Letters to Santa, appearing alongside Nathan Lane as a pair of airport security personnel.

In The Muppets, Bobo appears as a henchman of oil tycoon Tex Richman (Chris Cooper), who wants to demolish the Muppet Theater and drill for oil on the site. Along with fellow henchman Uncle Deadly, Bobo is not fully aware of the scheme that Richman is doing; at one point, he even turns to Uncle Deadly asking, "So, you think we're working for the bad guy?" He was seen partaking in the finale version of "Life's a Happy Song" where he was seen with Tex Richman's showgirls. In the television series The Muppets, he plays a key role as the stage manager for the talk show Up Late with Miss Piggy.

=== Robin the Frog ===
Robin the Frog

- Performed by Jerry Nelson (1971–2003), Matt Vogel (2008–2017), Peter Linz (2017–present)

Robin the Frog is Kermit's young, sweet-voiced nephew. He has appeared in most Muppet productions since The Muppet Show. He loves to spend time with his Uncle Kermit, his best friend Sweetums, and his boys' club, the Frog Scouts. Robin first appeared in The Frog Prince as Sir Robin the Brave. One of his most famous moments was singing "Halfway Down the Stairs," a song based on a poem by Winnie-the-Pooh creator A. A. Milne. He also has an important role in episode 212 of The Muppet Show, when he was feeling sad for being so small until the guest star Bernadette Peters and all Robin's Muppet friends sing the song "Just One Person" to cheer him up. In the animated Muppet Babies series, Robin appeared as a tadpole in a fish bowl, as all the characters were younger versions of their live-action selves, and was said to be the son of Kermit's (unnamed and unseen) big sister.

Robin's roles in the Muppet movies varied from supporting roles, minor roles and cameos to large roles, though he has not appeared in many Muppet movies. In The Muppet Movie (1979), he had a supporting role at the beginning of the movie at the film screening where he asks Kermit if the movie is about how the Muppets got started. He also had a few other scenes and is with the other Muppets in the finale. In the TV special John Denver and the Muppets: A Christmas Together (1979) Robin helps sing many of the Christmas Carols with the other Muppets and John Denver. In the TV movie Rocky Mountain Holiday (1982) Robin plays a more major role as he tries to help out as a Frog Scout and bonds with John Denver through the process. In The Muppets Take Manhattan (1984), he only appeared in the audience at the wedding. In A Muppet Family Christmas, Robin discovered the Fraggle hole in the basement, taking Kermit with him and meeting the five main Fraggles.

Robin played the role of Tiny Tim in The Muppet Christmas Carol (1992), his largest role to date. His next appearance was in the direct-to-video Muppet Classic Theater (1994) where he appeared in "The Emperor's New Clothes" sketch in a minimal role, realizing Fozzie (the emperor) was not wearing clothes. He also appeared alongside Kermit in The Elves and the Shoemaker sketch where he took on the role of the shoemaker's nephew. He had a minor role (with dialogue) in Muppets From Space (1999) in the boarding house. His final role with Jerry Nelson as his performer was in 2002's It's a Very Merry Muppet Christmas Movie, which was arguably his second-largest role to date, he appears in the Muppet Theatre in a few scenes and in the Moulin Scrooge scene as the green fairy. After a five-year absence, Robin returned in A Muppets Christmas: Letters to Santa, performed by Matt Vogel. He wore his Tiny Tim attire in a 2009 appearance on Late Night with Jimmy Fallon and made a non-speaking cameo appearance in the film The Muppets. Robin, along with his Uncle Kermit, appeared again on Late Night with Jimmy Fallon to sing "When the River Meets the Sea" on December 23, 2011, once again, performed by Matt Vogel. He also made a minor role in 2014's Muppets Most Wanted, again performed by Vogel. Robin (voiced by Vogel) is the "guest star" of the February 23, 2016 episode of The Muppets titled "Little Green Lie." In the episode, Kermit and Miss Piggy pretend to still be in a relationship so as not to upset Robin, whose parents are divorcing.

=== Sweetums ===
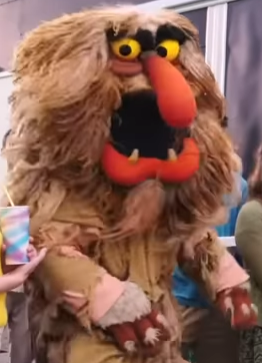
Sweetums from a 2013 Muppisode

- Performed by Jerry Nelson (1971, in-suit performer), Carl Banas (1971, voice only), Richard Hunt (1976–1991), John Henson (1992–2005), Noel MacNeal (2008), Matt Vogel (2009–present)

Sweetums is a very large, imposing and hairy ogre about nine feet tall. Despite appearing physically intimidating, he is often depicted as friendly and harmless. Sweetums has very thick blondish-brown hair all over his body. He has a very large lower jaw, similar to a bulldog, which juts out, revealing two pointy warthog-like tusks. He has thick, brown eyebrows over his large yellow eyes and large nose. He often wears a shabby, burlap-like brown shirt. Many are fooled by his intimidating appearance, but he is very nice and humble, hence his name, "Sweetums."

Sweetums first appeared on the television special The Frog Prince (based on the story of the same name) in 1971 as the henchman of a full-bodied Taminella Ginderfall (who was previously seen in the pilots to Tales of the Tinkerdee and The Land of Tinkerdee). There he tried to eat the hero, played by Kermit's nephew Robin. He later performed a duet with Robin and the two appeared together on merchandise as best friends. During his first appearance, Sweetums was performed by Muppeteer Jerry Nelson and voiced by voice veteran Carl Banas, but soon after, Richard Hunt made the character his own. Hunt gave life to Sweetums throughout the run of The Muppet Show and the first two Muppet movies. During the making of Muppet*Vision 3D when Hunt's health deteriorated, Muppet creator Jim Henson's son, John Henson, did the puppetry, while Hunt did the voice. After Richard Hunt died, John Henson eventually took over both the voice and puppetry.

Sweetums also played a car jack in a used-car lot in The Muppet Movie where a salesman introduced him as his Jack. When called "Jack" by Kermit, he replied, "Jack not name, jack job!" After Kermit and his friends ask him if he wants to go to Hollywood with them, he shouts "Hollywood!" repeatedly and runs away, only to come back with his suitcase shortly after the group has left. He pursues the group for the duration of the movie, finally making it to Hollywood, bursting through the movie screen, shouting "I made it!!" During the montage of the Muppets getting back together again in The Muppets, Sweetums is shown working at the same lot and is again forced to chase after the group's car. He also has supporting roles and minor roles in The Great Muppet Caper, Muppet Treasure Island, Muppets from Space, The Muppets' Wizard of Oz, and various other Muppet specials. Sweetums was performed by Matt Vogel in 2011's The Muppets and Muppets Most Wanted. The character was seen in an episode of Statler and Waldorf: From the Balcony. In the 2015 TV series, Sweetums is in charge of the cue cards for the show.

=== Lew Zealand ===
- Performed by Jerry Nelson (1978–2003), Bill Barretta (2002–2005), Matt Vogel (2008–present)

Lew Zealand is a tan humanoid Muppet with dark hair, a mustache, a red knobby nose, a ruff and a red ringmaster's suit. His name is a portmanteau of New Zealand and Lew Grade, the distributor of The Muppet Show. Lew started out as a Whatnot before a permanent puppet was made of him. Lew has an obsession for throwing fish, which are unique in that they return to him once thrown—hence the term "boomerang fish." His catchphrase is: "I throw the fish away, and it comes back to me!" Lew appears on The Muppet Show from season three onward trying to promote his Boomerang Fish act. He is also able to play a fish organ (a line of fish that, when squeezed, each gargle a different note). The sketches he appears in usually end with the entire stage in an uproar. In the "Marisa Berenson" episode, he played a major part in that episode by using his timely boomerang fish to prevent Kermit the Frog from being tricked into a real marriage during Miss Piggy's "wedding sketch." In the "Leslie Uggams" episode, Lew Zealand told Leslie how to be a great boomerang fish thrower by saying that "Well, you've got to have sole. And if you can't get sole, get halibut." In the "Lynn Redgrave" episode, he played a member of the Merry Men in the Robin Hood sketch.

Lew Zealand has had supporting roles in The Muppet Movie, The Great Muppet Caper, The Muppets Take Manhattan, Muppet Treasure Island, and Muppets Haunted Mansion. Lew Zealand has had cameo appearances in The Muppet Christmas Carol and Muppets From Space. Lew Zealand has a supporting role in The Muppets, where after rejoining the group to help save the Muppet Theatre from Tex Richman, Lew assists in kidnapping Jack Black to be the telethon's celebrity host. He later encourages Kermit not to give up on the Muppet Theatre. Lew reappears in Muppets Most Wanted, joining the rest of the Muppets on their world tour.

The Whatnot head construction for Lew Zealand was done by Dave Goelz and Lew Zealand's character finishing was done by Amy van Gilder. Jerry Nelson considered Lew Zealand to be a tribute to Frankie Fontaine. Nelson stated in an interview, "He had that dopey voice, but he could sing beautifully. We never did that part of it on the show, but just the idea of this guy who had a boomerang fish act. There were some really ridiculous acts on the show, and that was one of the all-time dopey ones."

=== Crazy Harry ===
- Performed by John Lovelady (1974, 1976–1977), Richard Hunt (1975–1981), Jerry Nelson (1977–2003), Rickey Boyd (2005), Matt Vogel (2008–present)

Crazy Harry is a pyrotechnician obsessed with explosives, who first appeared in The Muppets Valentine Show and later, The Muppet Show. Crazy Harry has black scruffy hair, an uncombed chin curtain beard and huge, egg-shaped baggy eyes. Early in season one, he played triangle with the pit band. He usually carried a plunger box which would activate a hidden charge, often to his victim's chagrin. Once he assisted Gonzo the Great in a cannonball-catching act but perhaps overdid it on the powder, which resulted in an absurdly stretched right arm for Gonzo. In episode 28 he provided the "Ra-ta-ta-ta-ta!" chorus of "Chanson d'Amour," happily blowing the stage and performers to smithereens with his little plunger and cackling. Harry also played solo backup for Jean Stapleton's performance of "I'm Just Wild About Harry," with a collection of plunger boxes forming an "explodaphone," providing explosions at the end of every verse of the song. In the show's first couple of seasons, Harry's appearances were a regular running gag. After those first seasons, the gag was shelved along with Crazy Harry for the remainder of the show's run.

Crazy Harry also appeared in The Muppet Movie, complete with his explosive equipment, as one of the many Muppets in the audience to whom Kermit the Frog screened the film. He appeared in The Muppets Take Manhattan as a wedding guest. In 2009, he appeared in the Muppets music video "Bohemian Rhapsody." In 2011, he appeared in The Muppets, blasting his likeness onto Mount Rushmore—destroying Abraham Lincoln's face in the process—during the film's montage. In 2014, he appeared in a Toyota Highlander commercial, blasting Gonzo from a cannon, like a human cannonball, through the sunroof. In 2014, he appeared in Muppets Most Wanted, in which a criminal uses the noise of Harry's explosions to cover the sounds of a break-in.

For the commercials for the then-new TNT cable channel, Crazy Harry would be featured at the end of the commercials, prefixing his use of his plunger with the question "Did someone say TNT?"—followed by a maniacal laugh after the explosion. In the Dresden Files novel Blood Rites, several references are made to the "Bolshevik Muppet with all the dynamite." The phrase "Bolshevik Muppet" was then used as a warning by Harry Dresden to his allies just prior to setting off a large explosion.

=== Beauregard ===
- Performed by Dave Goelz (1978–present)

Beauregard is the Muppets' dim-witted backstage janitor and stagehand of indeterminate species. Debuting in season three of The Muppet Show, Beauregard originally wore a gray jacket over his plaid shirt, but in the fourth season, he stopped wearing the jacket. It is revealed in The Muppet Show On Tour that he calls his mop "Belleregard." Beaker occasionally assists Beauregard with stagehand duties. He tries to be helpful, but his dimwitted efforts frequently result in disaster. His slow wit is often preyed upon by other characters who use him to their own purposes. He has a characteristic blink and often turns to the camera and says, "Right." Beauregard has superhuman strength, which is illustrated by his ability to effortlessly lift and carry around objects that are far too heavy to carry, such as an anvil, couch or piano.

Beauregard appeared on the stage in various sketches and skits. Other times, Beauregard appears accidentally on stage during productions, still working on the props until he realizes that he is intruding and must either rush out of sight or attempt to blend in with the action. However, Beauregard was more comfortable backstage.

Beauregard also appeared in The Great Muppet Caper in 1981, where he played a taxi driver. He brought Kermit, Fozzie, and Gonzo to the Happiness Hotel, and right through the front door, into the lobby. Beauregard's other major role was in the 1990 special The Muppets at Walt Disney World, where he dragged Miss Piggy onto a series of thrill rides.

He has also had minor roles in later projects, including The Muppets Take Manhattan, Muppets Tonight and The Muppets: A Celebration of 30 Years, and a cameo appearance in It's a Very Merry Muppet Christmas Movie. In the book Of Muppets and Men, Goelz explains that Beauregard was based on the clumsy Wendell Porcupine from Emmet Otter's Jug Band Christmas. The main reason why Beauregard never became a star was because the writers thought he was too passive, he did not desire anything. This made Beauregard difficult to write for. In The Muppets, Beauregard is found by Scooter living in the janitor's closet of the old Muppet Theatre, seemingly unaware that The Muppet Show is no longer on the air. In Muppets Most Wanted, Beauregard is the engineer of the train that is used for the Muppets' world tour.

=== Link Hogthrob ===
- Performed by Jim Henson (1977–1990), Steve Whitmire (2000–2016), Peter Linz (2017–present)

Link Hogthrob is a dim-witted pig possessing traits of a stereotypical leading man, with wavy blond hair, a manly cleft chin, and a high opinion of himself. In The Muppet Show, Link is best known as the captain of the Swinetrek on the recurring sketch Pigs in Space where his unbridled machismo is often a source of conflict with his co-star, First Mate Piggy. Unlike Dr. Julius Strangepork, whose role on The Muppet Show would primarily be on Pigs in Space sketches including "Wonder Pig," Link would feature regularly both in the show's onstage acts and backstage mayhem. Link's singing talents featured a number of times in solos (such as "Sonny Boy"), duets ("Là ci darem la mano"), and group numbers. Starting in the show's third season, Link was also featured as the police chief in the recurring Bear on Patrol sketches, where his dimwittedness was often the source of physical trauma to patrol officer Fozzie Bear. Henson's son, Brian Henson, recalled that his father often used Link's deep-throated, pompous voice when performing some stereotypically masculine chore, such as carving the Thanksgiving turkey.

Link was later one of the few classic Muppet Show characters to be used regularly in the Muppet Central control room on The Jim Henson Hour.

Since Henson's death, Link has mostly remained a non-speaking Muppet, although he has since appeared occasionally in silent cameos in such productions as The Muppet Christmas Carol, Muppet Treasure Island, Muppets Tonight and Muppets from Space. His only speaking roles from 1990 to 2011 were in the video games Muppet RaceMania and Muppets Party Cruise, as voiced by Steve Whitmire. Whitmire performed Link for the 2011 movie The Muppets. The appearance featured the first speaking appearance of the puppet ever since Henson's death. Link appears in several scenes in the background and gets a moment in the spotlight as part of a barbershop quartet, singing "Smells Like Teen Spirit." In Muppets Most Wanted, Link returned to prominence for the first time in decades, having several lines of dialogue and his own scene with Usher.

An animated version of Link was seen in Pigs in Space segments in Little Muppet Monsters (voiced by Bob Bergen) and an episode of Muppet Babies. A walk-around version of Link was created for The Muppet Show on Tour. An action figure of Link was produced in 2003 as part of Series 4 of Palisades Toys' line of Muppet action figures.

=== The Newsman ===
- Performed by Jim Henson (1976–1990), Richard Hunt (1981), Jerry Nelson (1996), Brian Henson (2001–2003), Steve Whitmire (2008–2016), Eric Jacobson (2017–present)

The Newsman is the bespectacled newsman for The Muppet Show, who tries to deliver the news with accuracy, but is visibly flummoxed on camera by the day's latest bizarre story or interview. Interviews were a more common part of the Muppet News Flash segments in its first season, where the interviewees were portrayed by the show's guest star. From the second season onward, he would almost invariably suffer some calamity related to the story, such as having items dropped on his head or the newsroom destroyed.

=== Pops ===
- Performed by Jerry Nelson (1980–2002), Matt Vogel (2011–present)

Pops is an elderly doorman at the Muppet Theatre in The Muppet Show. He greeted the week's guest star in every episode of the fifth season. He also had a major part as the innkeeper of the Happiness Hotel in The Great Muppet Caper. Since then, he has only had a couple of supporting roles, minor roles and cameo appearances.

=== Marvin Suggs ===
- Performed by Frank Oz (1976–1981), Eric Jacobson (2011–present)

Marvin Suggs is a flamboyant musician that wears a frilly, multicolored shirt. He is best known for playing an instrument known as a Muppaphone, a group of small, round, furry pink and orange Muppets that emit a tonal "ow" voiced by Henson and Jerry Nelson when Marvin strikes them on the head with his mallet. During season three of The Muppet Show, Suggs and the Muppaphone were part of an "explicit criticism of violence" with Suggs being explicitly punished for his violence in an episode where a witchdoctor turns Suggs head into a Muppaphone. The act has been compared to the sketch from Monty Python's Flying Circus called "Arthur Ewing and His Musical Mice." He was designed by Rollie Krewson. He appears in The Muppet Movie and 2011's The Muppets.

=== Clifford ===
- Performed by Kevin Clash (1989–2005)

Clifford is a cool, lavender-colored, catfish-faced, sunglasses-wearing character with multicolored dreadlocks. He was created to be the bassist for Solid Foam, the band on The Jim Henson Hour (1989).

When The Jim Henson Hour was canceled, Clifford was the only major character (beyond the classic Muppet Show characters) to make further appearances. In 1990, he appeared as a member of The Electric Mayhem in The Muppets at Walt Disney World television special. In that special, Clifford played glockenspiel, tambourine, and cowbells. Months later, he then appeared in The Muppets Celebrate Jim Henson, in which he read one of the fan letters about Jim Henson's death. Clifford also made appearances on The Arsenio Hall Show (alongside Henson in his last television appearance) and VH1. He also co-starred with Kermit in a sing-along video and appeared in a music video.

In 1996, Clifford became the host of Muppets Tonight. In addition to being the host, his appearance was changed as well. He had visible eyes instead of his sunglasses and wore a suit and necktie instead of a Hawaiian shirt. The puppet's head was also built slightly bigger. In 2001 at a Muppet fan convention, Kevin Clash revealed that he disliked the visible eyes and will not perform Clifford again unless he is wearing his sunglasses.

When Muppets Tonight ended in 1998, Clifford was returned to his original sunglasses look for his last two appearances in Muppets from Space, which was released in 1999, and The Muppets' Wizard of Oz, which was released in 2005.

== Other characters ==
=== Frackles ===
Frackles are a classification of Muppet monsters. They first appeared in the 1970 television special The Great Santa Claus Switch. They would then appear in later Muppet projects that include but are not limited to The Muppet Show, The Muppet Movie, Muppets Tonight, and Muppets Most Wanted. Characteristics of a Frackle include fur and hooked beaks that may include teeth. They are normally small to medium size in stature, but there are exceptions. The Frackles became nameless, utility characters without personalities. They often changed appearance, performer, name and gender depending on the sketch and show.

The known Frackles are:

- A Blue Frackle with large, pointy ears and an hawk-like beak that first appeared as "Boppity" in The Great Santa Claus Switch. It was variously performed by Frank Oz, Richard Hunt, Dave Goelz, Jim Henson, and Jerry Nelson at different points in The Muppet Show and David Rudman in The Muppet Christmas Carol. The Muppets Character Encyclopedia referred to it as "Bolshy Blue Frackle".
- A Green Frackle with an eagle-like beak that first appeared as "Gloat" in The Great Santa Claus Switch where he was performed by Greg Antonacci. It was variously performed by Jim Henson, Frank Oz, John Lovelady, and Richard Hunt at different points in The Muppet Show. The Muppets Character Encyclopedia referred to it as "Grumpy Green Frackle".
- A purple Dragon Frackle who gets its name from its dragon-like appearance first appeared in The Great Santa Claus Switch and appeared in two cameo appearances in The Muppet Show and an audience cameo in The Muppet Show special.
- A Snake Frackle who gets its name from having a snake tail instead of legs first appeared in The Great Santa Claus Switch. It was performed by John Lovelady and Richard Hunt during The Muppet Show.
- A Green Bird Frackle who gets its name from its more bird-like appearance first appeared in The Great Santa Claus Switch. It was performed by Eren Ozker and Abby Hadfield at different points in The Muppet Show.
- A Blue Bird Frackle similar to the Green Bird Frackle first appeared as "Scoff" in The Great Santa Claus Switch. It was performed by John Lovelady at one point in The Muppet Show.
- Six Frackles were introduced in an episode of The Muppet Show where they make up Glenda Jackson's pirate crew.
  - A Pink Frackle that nearly resembled the Blue Frackle.
  - A Purple Frackle with two lower teeth and fuzzy dark purple hair. It was performed by Frank Oz and Jerry Nelson during The Muppet Show and Steve Whitmire in a Disney Xtreme Digital Project in 2008.
  - A Gray-Purple Frackle who sports grayish-fur, purple skin, no hair on top of its head, and claws for hands. It was performed by Jerry Nelson in The Muppet Christmas Carol where it portrayed a turkey vendor.
  - A Jade Green Frackle who has jade green fur, many fangs and a hunchbacked appearance. It was performed by Rob Mills in an episode of The Jim Henson Hour and by Tyler Bunch in the bonus features of The Muppets under the alias of J.G.
  - An Emerald Green Frackle who has emerald green fur and two upper fangs.
  - A Green-Pink Frackle who has green fur and a faded pink face. It was performed by Kevin Clash at one point in The Jim Henson Hour.
- Mo Frackle appeared with the Muppets in a 2001 episode of Family Feud performed by Bruce Lanoil who reprised him in most appearances. His design evokes the traits of the Blue Frackle and the Green Frackle. He's made other appearance in other projects.
- Rankin Frackle is a teal Frackle who was first seen in a Macy's window display during the 2002 Christmas season and later appeared in a "Muppet Labs" segment in The Muppets Take the O2.

Gonzo originated as a Frackle living in a cigar box named "Snarl" in The Great Santa Claus Switch.

=== Penguins ===
The Muppet version of the Penguins are often seen in various Muppet productions.

While most of them are nameless, there had been some known Penguins that were named:

- Gloria Estefan Penguin performed by Peter Linz A Magellanic penguin chick who has a fondness for drinking martinis that debuts in the TV series The Muppets. Gloria was adopted by Miss Piggy during her trip to Argentina and quickly forms a bond with Uncle Deadly.
- Nicky Napoleon performed by James Kroupa – A penguin from Muppet*Vision 3D and Little Muppet Monsters who is the leader of the band Nicky Napoleon and His Emperor Penguins.
- Winky Pinkerton performed by Steve Whitmire in the "Loretta Lynn" episode – A penguin who does bird impressions and is the first known Penguin to appear in The Muppet Show before the generic Penguins came into view. He was built by Brian Henson.

The 2018 version of Muppet Babies introduced Summer Penguin (voiced by Jessica DiCicco) who is the Muppet Babies' residential artist and the shortest of the group.

=== Whatnots ===
The Whatnots are Muppets extras designed with blank heads and faces, clothes, and hair that can be customized for different roles. Similar generic puppets used for Sesame Street are known as Anything Muppets. The characters of Scooter, Lew Zealand, and Marvin Suggs were originally created using Whatnot puppets before permanent puppets were made for them. The Muppet Whatnot Workshop at FAO Schwarz opened in 2008, which allowed people to purchase a custom Whatnot with chosen clothes and facial features. Whatnot kits were later sold through Toys 'R' Us after the chain acquired FAO Schwarz.

=== Additional characters ===
Name	Performer(s)	Description
'80s Robot	Matt Vogel	A 1980s-esque robot chauffeur and servant who debuted in The Muppets. In the film, he lives in Kermit's mansion, after the breakup of the Muppets. '80s Robot also functions as a chauffeur and uses his databanks and search engine to locate the Muppet troupe. Created by Jason Segel and Nicholas Stoller, the character—as his name implies—resembles the many robots who dominated the toy, novelty, and pop culture landscape in the 1980s. He uses slang from the era and offers such beverages as Tab and New Coke. '80s Robot is said to bear an uncanny resemblance to Omnibot 2000, a robot toy made by Tomy in the 1980s that was used to portray Robin Sparkles' sidekick in a television series Segel was on. '80s Robot was designed by Legacy Effects. He subsequently reappears in Muppets Most Wanted.
Afghan Hound	Louise Gold (1977–1981), Richard Hunt (1977), Kathryn Mullen (1980), Alice Dinnean (2011-present)	An Afghan Hound who first appeared in episode 214 of The Muppet Show.
Andy and Randy Pig	Andy: Brian Henson (1994), Steve Whitmire (1996–2016), Bill Barretta (2016–present); Randy: Dave Goelz (1994–present)	Miss Piggy's dimwitted young nephews that debuted in Muppet Classic Theater, in a version of "Three Little Pigs". They later appeared on Muppets Tonight as production assistants, where their severe ineptitude caused the show more harm than help. They were featured in the recurring sketches "Bay of Pigswatch" and "The Eagle's Nest".
Angel Marie	Bill Barretta, John Kennedy, Peter Linz, Tyler Bunch	A green monster who first appeared in Muppet Treasure Island
Annie Sue	Louise Gold	A young female pig who is Miss Piggy's innocent rival. She first appeared in episode 214 of The Muppet Show, but was given a proper introduction in episode 302.
Astoria	Bob Payne	The wife of Waldorf who appeared just once on The Muppet Show in episode 413 when Statler is unavailable. She strongly resembles Statler.
Bad Polly Lobster	Kevin Clash	A lobster who first appeared in Muppet Treasure Island as the pet of Long John Silver and hook for a right claw. He later appeared in the UK Spots of Muppets Tonight running a diner with Clueless Morgan and interacting with the unseen Mr. Callahan.
Baskerville the Hound	Dave Goelz, Jim Henson, Jerry Nelson, Frank Oz, John Lovelady	A small, shaggy, brown dog with glasses and a pointed snout, who was originally created in 1962 as a foil for Rowlf the Dog in a series of Purina Dog Chow commercials.
Bean Bunny	Steve Whitmire (1986-2009), Bradley Freeman Jr. (2025–present)	A small rabbit who first appeared in the HBO special The Tale of the Bunny Picnic as the main character. Bean Bunny also appears in Muppet Babies, The Jim Henson Hour, and also appeared in the theme park attraction Muppet*Vision 3D. Additionally, he had minor roles and cameos in most Muppet films after The Muppet Christmas Carol. Bean Bunny was designed by Diana Dawson-Hall and built by Rollie Krewson.
Beautiful Day Monster	Jim Henson, Frank Oz, Caroll Spinney, Richard Hunt, Jerry Nelson, Dan Redican, Kevin Clash, Bill Barretta, David Rudman	A bluish-gray monster who debuted in an un-aired General Foods commercial for their products Wheels, Flutes, and Crowns as the Crown-Grabber. He later appeared in various variety show performances, most notably on The Ed Sullivan Show. Beautiful Day Monster got his name by the creators from this appearance, where he purposely sabotaged a girl's beautiful day, before being shrunk by her compliments and swatted with a fly swatter. He made several appearances on the first season of Sesame Street where he was referred to as “Fred”, “Snookie”, and “Ralph”. After the first season, Beautiful Day Monster and most of the other early Sesame monsters were replaced by friendlier looking monsters with brighter colors.
Behemoth	Dave Goelz, Richard Hunt, Jerry Nelson, Steve Whitmire, Brian Henson, Bill Barretta	A large full-bodied orange monster who is one of the Muppets who eat other Muppets. He has since also been called "Gene".
Beverly Plume	Julianne Buescher	A turkey who hosts the "Økėÿ Døkęÿ Køøkïñ" segments on Muppets Now.
Big Mean Carl	Dave Goelz (1992), Steve Whitmire (2008), Bill Barretta (1996-present)	A shaggy, horned monster who enjoys consuming objects, other Muppets, normal animals, and, very rarely, even humans. He first appeared on the Muppet Meeting Films segment "Think Bigger" as the Chairman Blodgett, and as different occupations in Muppets Tonight. In the TV series The Muppets, Carl acts as the receptionist at the studio where Up Late with Miss Piggy is filmed. Besides being a Francophile, Big Mean Carl has a similar-looking sister named Big Mean Carla; she is also carnivorous, and works in the real estate business.
Bill	Dave Goelz, Kevin Clash	A brown-haired frog with ears.
Bill the Bubble Guy	Dave Goelz	Performer whose head spurts out bubbles.
Bobby Benson	Richard Hunt (1978–1992), David Rudman (2014–present)	Nuanced musician and director of the "baby band", who first appeared in episode 319 of The Muppet Show.
Bubba the Rat	Bill Barretta	A tough-talking rat.
Butch	Jim Henson, Jerry Nelson, Brian Muehl	A Bengal tiger.
Chester the Rat	Dave Goelz	A male rat and friend of Rizzo's who first appeared in The Muppets Take Manhattan.
Chip	Gord Robertson (1989–1997), Dave Goelz (1997–present)	A nerdy technician who first appeared on The Jim Henson Hour where he was the technician of Gorilla Television. In the TV series The Muppets, Chip worked as the IT Technician for Up Late with Miss Piggy. He also appears on Muppets Now.
Clueless Morgan	Bill Barretta	An anthropomorphic goat who first appeared as one of Long John Silver's henchman in Muppet Treasure Island. He later appeared with Bad Polly in the UK Spots of Muppets Tonight where they ran a diner and interacted with the unseen Mr. Callahan.
Constantine	Matt Vogel	An evil Russian frog who is considered to be the "World's Most Dangerous Frog", Interpol's most wanted criminal, and a doppelgänger for Kermit. Appearing in Muppets Most Wanted, Constantine serves as the main antagonist of the film and differs slightly from Kermit in physical appearance as his eye pupils line up differently, and he has a shorter neck collar, and a distinctive mole on the right side of his face. In the film, Constantine escapes a Siberian gulag becoming a fugitive from the main prison warden Nadya (Tina Fey). Constantine collaborates with Dominic Badguy (Ricky Gervais) to conduct robberies all across Europe, framing the Muppets as culprits until the two of them are defeated and arrested by the police. The filmmakers tasked in designing Constantine originally planned to have him be a paler shade of green than Kermit. However, early camera tests revealed that the color differed too greatly from Kermit's, clashing with the filmmakers' intentions of having Constantine bear a strong resemblance to him. Instead, Constantine's neck collar was made shorter and with wider spikes. Following a suggestion by director James Bobin, Vogel based his performance on the Russian antagonist, General Orlov, in Octopussy.
Country Trio	Jim: Jim Henson; Frank: Frank Oz; Jerry: Jerry Nelson	A hillbilly band consisting of caricatures of Henson, Oz and Nelson.
Dead Tom	Bruce Lanoil	A skeleton.
Denise	Julianne Buescher	A pig who is the head of ABC's marketing department. She is Kermit's girlfriend and love interest in The Muppets.
Digit	Dave Goelz	A semi-robotic person who worked as MuppeTelevision's Technical Director on The Jim Henson Hour.
Doglion	Jerry Nelson, Frank Oz, Jim Henson, Dave Goelz, Rob Mills, Noel MacNeal, Bill Barretta	A large monster with a dog-like face that is often seen with Sweetums.
Dr. Julius Strangepork	Jerry Nelson (1977–2003), David Rudman (1988), Matt Vogel (2008–present)	A pig that appears as a chief science officer in the "Pigs in Space" sketches on The Muppet Show.
Dr. Phil Van Neuter	Brian Henson	A mad scientist and veterinarian who is the host of the Muppets Tonight sketch "Tales from the Vet".
Droop	Jerry Nelson (1974-1992), Frank Oz (1971), Jim Henson (1976), Richard Hunt (1978), Peter Linz (2011-present)	A green monster with a long pointy nose. Droop originated in The Great Santa Claus Switch where he was called Snivelly.
Emily Bear	Jerry Nelson (1977–1992), Matt Vogel (2019–present)	Fozzie Bear's elderly mother. Debuted in episode 216 of The Muppet Show.
The Fazoobs	Various puppeteers	A group of musical Muppets from the planet Koozebane who auditioned for an act in episode 208 of The Muppet Show. They consist of a fish-like round purple Fazoob with a green fin, a bird-like yellow-headed Fazoob with a red body, a trumpet-mouthed Fazoob named Cute, and an unnamed Fazoob.
Fleet Scribbler	Jerry Nelson	A purple humanoid Muppet and the gossip journalist for "The Daily Scandal" who appeared in Season 2 of The Muppet Show.
Fletcher Bird	Graham Fletcher (performer), Steve Whitmire (voice)	A large multi-colored dancing bird.
Flower-Eating Monster	Jim Henson	A dark purple dog-eared Muppet monster who has an appetite for flowers.
The Flying Zucchini Brothers	Various puppeteers	An Italian acrobat/daredevil act on The Muppet Show. They also appeared in The Muppet Show On Tour. The Zucchini Brothers are best known for their Human Cannon Ball act. This act is mostly performed by three Zucchini brothers and one cannon, although the Wally Boag episode features six brothers and five cannons. Some of the Zucchini Brothers' names are Biondo (episode 412), Marco, Giuseppi, Luigi, Lorenzo, and Heathcliff (the "Mama's Boy" of the group). The Zucchini Brother puppets are Whatnots; they tend to look a little differently in each episode, although their design remains basically the same.
Foo-Foo	Steve Whitmire (1979-2016), Peter Linz (2019-present)	Miss Piggy's white Bichon Frisé dog, who is portrayed by both a puppet and a real dog. Debuted in episode 404 of The Muppet Show.
Gaffer	Kathryn Mullen	A female cat with an eyepatch who hangs around backstage.
George the Janitor	Frank Oz (1974-1996), Richard Hunt (1976), Steve Whitmire (1996)	A crusty old custodian on The Muppet Show who has no affection for anyone or anything except his mop. Frequently appeared onstage as part of the regular dancing sequence.
Gil	Steve Whitmire, Kevin Clash, Bill Barretta	A gray-haired bespectacled frog.
Gladys	Richard Hunt	A cafeteria lady who appears in the third season.
Gorgon Heap	Frank Oz, Richard Hunt, Dave Goelz, Jerry Nelson	A purple Muppet monster who is one of the Muppets who eat other Muppets. His appearance has shifted between a live-hand puppet form and a full-bodied puppet form.
Hilda	Eren Ozker (1976-1977); Stephanie D'Abruzzo (2026)	An old wardrobe lady who appears in the first season.
Howard Tubman	Bill Barretta	A rich food-loving pig. His puppet was previously used for one of the native pigs from Muppet Treasure Island. Howard Tubman also makes a cameo as a guest at Miss Piggy's wedding in Muppets Most Wanted. In the season one finale of The Muppets. Howard Tubman hooked Scooter up with some acts that he represents.
Hugga Wugga	Frank Oz	A purple creature with a funnel nose that's used to blast other creatures.
Iggy Wiggy	John Lovelady	A small bird-like creature.
Jill	Kathryn Mullen	A female frog with long brown hair. In 2021, she later appears in the television series Muppet Babies, voiced by Ashley Spillers.
Joe the Legal Weasel	Peter Linz	A weasel who works as the Muppets' lawyer. He is a recycled version of one of the Prairie Dog puppets from The Muppet Show.
Johnny Fiama and Sal Minella	Johnny Fiama: Bill Barretta (1996-present); Sal Minella: Brian Henson (1996–2005, 2021-present)	A duo, with Johnny modeled after Frank Sinatra and Sal as a vest-wearing chimpanzee and Johnny's bodyguard. Johnny and Sal Minella (whose name is a pun on salmonella) made their first appearances in Muppets Tonight. Johnny Fiama's surname is an anagram of mafia. His name suggests Johnny Fontane, the Sinatra-like character in The Godfather. Johnny appears in Muppets from Space (1999), after the cancellation of Muppets Tonight where he is seen as being roommates with Sal. He has a quick scene with a few lines of dialogue at Gonzo's party; when Sal cuts the cake meant for Gonzo's family, and Gonzo gets mad, they pretend not to have done so and go around asking who cut the cake. Johnny was a part of the main cast for It's a Very Merry Muppet Christmas Movie (2002) where he is seen exchanging gifts with Sal in the opening while singing "Jingle Bells". He is also seen trying to cheer Kermit up, along with some of the more prominent Muppets. Johnny's next film role was The Muppets' Wizard of Oz (2005) with Sal yet again. The two have quite a large role (though not as large as the previous film) as one of many of the Wicked Witch of the West's (Miss Piggy) flying monkeys, though they appear multiple other times as well. After a 12-year absence, they returned as the ghosts of Constance Hatchway's exes in Muppets Haunted Mansion.
Koozebanians	Frank Oz (Male), Jerry Nelson (Female)	A pair of Aliens who perform "The Galley-oh-hoop-hoop" in The Muppets Valentine Show.
La Cabra	Julianne Buescher	A screaming goat that appeared in Muppets Now.
Larb	Bill Barretta	A small monster with long limbs who held up the cue cards in Muppets Tonight. He later appeared in the 2026 The Muppet Show special as the maître' d in Statler and Waldorf's box seat.
Louis Kazagger	Jerry Nelson (1978-1997)	A sports commentator.
Luncheon Counter Monster	Dave Goelz, Richard Hunt, Jerry Nelson, Gord Robertson, Kevin Clash, Steve Whitmire, David Rudman, Brian Herring, Drew Massey, Nigel Plaskitt, Noel MacNeal, Bill Barretta	A ravenous purple monster with a penchant who eats luncheon counter props.
Mahna Mahna	Jim Henson (1969–1976), Bill Barretta (2001–present)	A purple, wild orange-haired Muppet in a green tunic, often paired with the Snowths. He is notable for performing "Mah Nà Mah Nà".
Mary Louise	Eren Ozker, Fran Brill, Rollie Krewson, Louise Gold	A little girl Whatnot with blonde hair. She made frequent appearances on The Muppet Show.
Masterson the Rat	Bruce Edward Hall	A male rat and friend of Rizzo's who first appeared in The Muppets Take Manhattan.
Mean Mama	Richard Hunt, Dave Goelz, Jim Henson, Jerry Nelson, Louise Gold, Eric Jacobson,	A large brown voracious monster. Her appearance has shifted between a live-hand puppet form and a full-bodied puppet form.
Mildred Huxtetter	Richard Hunt (1974), Frank Oz (1976-1977), Dave Goelz (1976), Louise Gold (1977, 1978)	An aristocratic and educated purple, beak-nosed woman.
The Moopets	Miss Poogy: David Rudman; Kermoot: Dave Goelz; Foozie Bear: Tyler Bunch; Janooce: Matt Vogel; Roowlf the Dog: Matt Vogel; Animool: Dave Grohl	A street-themed Muppet tribute band based at a casino in Reno. They consist of Miss Poogy, Kermoot, Foozie Bear, Janooce, Roowlf the Dog, and Animool (a man dressed as Animal).
Mulch	Jerry Nelson (1980s); Kevin Clash (1990s)	A hunchbacked monster.
The Muppaphones	Various performers	A musical instrument made up of pink and orange living balls of fluff. These creatures, members of an as yet unnamed species, are played by Marvin Suggs, who strikes them with mallets in order to elicit the cries of pain that form the Muppaphone's music ("Ow, ow, ow, ow...").
The Mutations	Various performers	A trio of full-bodied dancing purple monsters who are a parody of The Temptations.
Nigel (The Muppet Show version)	Jim Henson (1975, 1976), John Lovelady (1977), Dave Goelz (1979), Peter Linz (2026)	An orchestra conductor on The Muppet Show who acted as the host of The Muppet Show: Sex and Violence.
Nigel (Muppets Tonight version)	Brian Henson	A light green monster with a long pointy nose who serves as the stressed-out director of Muppets Tonight.
Mr. Poodlepants	Steve Whitmire	An eccentric fashion designer who first appeared on Muppets Tonight.
Old Tom	Jerry Nelson, Allan Trautman	An old man with a long white beard and sunglasses.
Pokey	Stephanie D'Abruzzo	A character who is primarily seen in the background of several Muppet productions. Pokey's most significant role to date has been that of the studio director in The Muppets Take Over Today. The character (performed by Stephanie D'Abruzzo) was named in this appearance on-screen by Joe Michaels, The Today Show director, whom Pokey replaced during the takeover of the show. Pokey's earliest appearance with the Muppets was in episode 201 of Muppets Tonight in a Tales from the Vet sketch. Later, Pokey would appear in the post office in A Muppets Christmas: Letters to Santa during "Delivering Christmas", and in background scenes of The Muppets, Muppets Most Wanted, Muppets Haunted Mansion, and as part of crowds in various commercials and promos. In 2017, Pokey appeared with Luncheon Counter Monster and Mo Frackle as Beaker's internet friends in the Muppet Labs sketch from The Muppets Take the Bowl, which was later reprised in The Muppets Take the O2.
Real Old Tom	Kevin Clash, Dave Goelz, Alice Dinnean	A mummified man.
Satay	Peter Linz (2026)	A brown monster who appeared as a nurse in the "E-I-E-I-OR" sketch of Muppets Tonight. It later appeared as a disgruntled performer in the 2026 The Muppet Show special.
Screaming Thing	Jerry Nelson	A green, pink-feathered creature with wheels for feet who only appeared in The Muppet Show episode starring Don Knotts, singing the song The Windmills of Your Mind and getting injured.
Seymour	Brian Henson	An elephant who was paired with Pepe on Muppets Tonight, working as an elevator operator and commissary cook.
Shakey Sanchez	Jerry Nelson, Jim Henson, Steve Whitmire, Dave Goelz,	A small, very nervous pink creature with red hair and yellow eyes.
Snowths	Frank Oz, Jerry Nelson, Dave Goelz, John Kennedy, Julianne Buescher, Kevin Clash, Victor Yerrid, Brett O’Quinn, Matt Vogel, Peter Linz, Steve Whitmire, Eric Jacobson, Drew Massey	Two furry pink, tube-mouthed, horned creatures that assist Mahna Mahna in his song, "Mah Nà Mah Nà".
Sopwith the Camel	Jerry Nelson	A full-bodied Bactrian camel. His name is a play on the Sopwith Camel airplane.
Spamela Hamderson	Leslie Carrara-Rudolph	A female pig who is a spoof of actress Pamela Anderson on Muppets Tonight.
Splurge	Frank Oz	A large purple monster who is the first full-bodied Muppet. He debuted in Hey, Cinderella!.
Sundance	Dave Goelz, Jerry Nelson	A lion.
Tatooey the Rat	Brian Muehl	A male rat and friend of Rizzo's who first appeared in The Muppets Take Manhattan.
Thingy-Thing	Jerry Nelson (1976), David Rudman (2014), Peter Linz (2015)	A small yellow creature with a red ring of fur around his neck. He was first seen in The Muppet Show in episode #118, during the "Hugga Wugga" sketch.
Thog	Jerry Nelson (1970–1980), Tyler Bunch (2011, puppeteer only), Olly Taylor (2014, puppeteer only), Paul McGinnis (2026, puppeteer only)	A large, blue full-bodied monster with droopy ears and a sweet disposition, who first appeared in The Great Santa Claus Switch. While originally shown to be 9 1/2 ft., he appeared 11 1/2 ft. in The Muppets. When it came to the 2026 TV special, a green screen was used to get the current puppet to fit through the arches.
Timmy Monster	Jim Henson, Dave Goelz, Steve Whitmire	A large green monster with anglerfish-like jaws.
Trumpet Girl/Dolores	Eren Ozker	A female purple Whatnot who is the description used in scripts of The Muppet Show for the female trumpet player in the Muppet Orchestra.
Ubu	Rob Mills	A blue gorilla who worked for Gorilla Television on The Jim Henson Hour.
Waldo C. Graphic	Steve Whitmire	A computer-generated Muppet, appearing in The Jim Henson Hour and Muppet*Vision 3D.
Wayne and Wanda	Wayne: Richard Hunt (1976–1981), David Rudman (2011–present); Wanda: Eren Ozker (1976), Kathryn Mullen (1979), Alice Dinnean (2011), Julianne Buescher (2017, 2018)	A married pair of snobby singers with a mutual inability to get past the first verse of any song that they sing without being interrupted by some disaster or another.
Yolanda Rat	Karen Prell (1984–1985), Camille Bonora (1988), Alice Dinnean (2010), Julianne Buescher (1994–present)	A female brown rat and friend of Rizzo's who first appeared in The Muppets Take Manhattan.
Zondra	Fran Brill (1989), Leslie Carrara-Rudolph (1997)	A goth woman who worked for Gorilla Television on The Jim Henson Hour and appeared on "The Real World Muppets" segments on Muppets Tonight, where she spoke with a British accent and was renamed to Darci.

== See also ==
- List of Sesame Street characters
- List of Fraggle Rock characters
