= Eren Ozker =

Turkish-American puppeteer (1948–1993)

- Born: July 25, 1948; Ankara, Turkey
- Died: February 25, 1993 (aged 44); New York City, US
- Education: University of Michigan
- Occupation: Puppeteer
- Years active: 1969–1993
- Spouse: William Bogert

Eren Ozker (July 25, 1948 – February 25, 1993) was a Turkish-American puppeteer. She was one of the primary performers during the first season of Jim Henson's television series The Muppet Show.

== Biography ==
Ozker was born in Ankara, Turkey, and grew up in Farmington Hills, Michigan. She received a bachelor's degree in drama from the University of Michigan in 1970. Right after graduating, she toured with the National Shakespeare Company, appearing in Hamlet (Ophelia) and The Merchant of Venice (Jessica). She moved to New York City shortly afterward to perform in numerous off-Broadway productions, such as The Master Builder, in which she portrayed Kaia Fosli. Reviews described her as "an Off-Broadway favorite" and as "a fire-cracker burning at both ends." In 1975, she joined the Hartman Theater Company for its first production, The Government Inspector, meeting her future husband, William Bogert, in the process during the original production of The Runner Stumbles.

In 1976, Ozker went to England and joined the cast of The Muppet Show. As the only full-time female Muppet performer on the show at the time, she performed most of the female characters. These included:

- Wanda - one-half of the singing duo Wayne and Wanda. Their "wholesome, uplifting and decent" acts, as described by Sam the Eagle, were always cut short in disastrous circumstances.
- Hilda - mostly restricted to backstage appearances, Hilda was the wardrobe lady for the show with a Slavic accent.
- Janice - Ozker's most famous character, Janice is the guitarist for Dr. Teeth and the Electric Mayhem, as taken over from Richard Hunt.

Of her three main characters, only Janice survived after Ozker left the show at the end of the first season. Janice was subsequently performed by Richard Hunt, Matt Vogel, Brian Henson, Tyler Bunch and, most recently, David Rudman.

After performing in Henson productions The Muppet Movie and Emmet Otter's Jug-Band Christmas, Ozker retired from the Muppet scene and returned to the United States to focus on her family. Her last puppeteering performance was in the 1988 production of The Warrior Ant at the Brooklyn Next Wave Festival.

In 1989, Ozker founded and became chairwoman of the Puppeteers Caucus, a working group within the Screen Actors Guild. Ozker was presented the Joseph C. Riley award by the Guild in 1991 in recognition of her services to the industry.

Ozker died on 25 February 1993, aged 44. Her husband, actor William Bogert, confirmed after her death that she died from cancer.

== Filmography ==
- The Muppet Show - Hilda, Wanda, Janice, Trumpet Girl, Talking House, Ghost, Additional Muppets
- Emmet Otter's Jug-Band Christmas - Gretchen Fox, Hetty Muskrat, Old Lady Possum, Mrs. Mink
- The Muppet Movie - Hilda, Gretchen Fox, Hetty Muskrat, Old Lady Possum, Mrs. Mink, Additional Muppets

Preceded by Fran Brill	Performer of Janice; 1976–1977	Succeeded by Richard Hunt
