= Swedish Chef =

Muppet character

The Swedish Chef
- The Muppets character
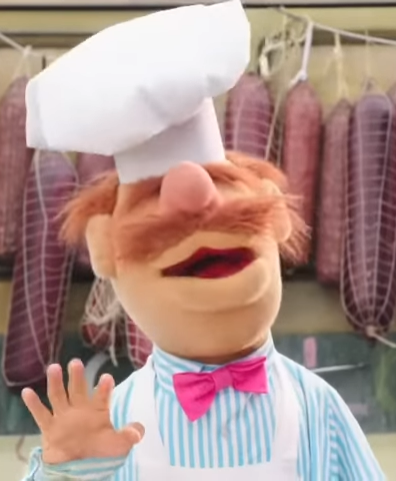
- First appearance: The Muppet Show: Sex and Violence (1975)
- Created by: Jim Henson
- Performed by: Principal performers; Jim Henson (1975–1990); Bill Barretta (1996–present); see all below

In-universe information
- Species: Muppet (Human)
- Gender: Male
- Occupation: Chef
- Nationality: Swedish

The Swedish Chef is a Muppet character from the sketch comedy television series The Muppet Show, known for his eccentric culinary skills and communicating in mock Swedish gibberish. He was originally performed by Jim Henson and Frank Oz simultaneously, with Henson performing the head and voice and Oz performing the character with real hands. The Swedish Chef is currently performed by Bill Barretta with Peter Linz performing the character's hands. The character is best known for his ridiculous cooking methods and the phrase "Bork, bork, bork!".

== Character ==
A parody of television chefs, the Swedish Chef wears a toque blanche, has a thick brown moustache and has bushy eyebrows that completely obscure his eyes. He was one of the few Muppets to employ an actual puppeteer's visible hands, which extended from the ends of his sleeves and facilitated handling food and utensils. Frank Oz originally provided the character's hands.

Nearly all Swedish Chef sketches on The Muppet Show feature him in a kitchen, waving some utensils while singing an introductory song in a mock language – a semi-comprehensible gibberish supposedly mimicking Swedish phonology and prosody. The song's lyrics vary slightly from one episode to the next, but always end with "Bork, bork, bork!" as the Chef throws the utensils aside, occasionally knocking items off a shelf or the back wall in the process.

After this introduction, the Chef begins to prepare a recipe while giving a gibberish explanation of what he is doing. His commentary is spiced with the occasional English word to clue in the viewer to what he is attempting. These hints are necessary as he frequently uses unorthodox culinary equipment (firearms, sports equipment, hand tools, etc.) to prepare his dishes (e.g. "See de moofin? Und here de boom-a-shootin" before tossing an English muffin into the air and blowing a hole through it with a blunderbuss to make a doughnut). The sketch typically degenerates into a slapstick finale where the equipment or ingredients (often a live animal he is attempting to cook) get the better of him.

The Chef is referred to by name in one episode, in which Danny Kaye plays his uncle. Kaye reels off a very long name but adds, "But we call him Tom" – much to the Chef's amusement. In 2010, the Chef was seen wearing a wedding ring, implying that the character is married.

== Development ==
Henson biographer Brian Jay Jones traces the origins of the Swedish Chef to 1961. That November, Henson was invited to provide entertainment at a United States Department of Agriculture U.S. Food Fair in Hamburg, Germany; one of the puppet skits he performed was "The Chef's Salad", an improvised piece starring Omar from Sam and Friends as a crazed cook. Presaging the Swedish Chef, the character was performed with "live hands" – Henson controlling the head and left hand, and Jerry Juhl controlling the right – and babbled expressively in mock German as he prepared a salad.

The Swedish Chef's first appearance was in 1974's The Muppet Show: Sex and Violence, the second pilot for what would become The Muppet Show. Henson's outline for the program described a chef who "create[s] new dishes—with subtitles in various languages... In the end, the dish explodes, walks away in disgust, or even eats him." The character was initially named "Jarnvagskorsning" before concerns about the name being too hard to recall or pronounce led to the much simpler "Swedish Chef".

To develop the Chef's speech, Sex and Violence writer Marshall Brickman prepared an instructional cassette tape on speaking mock Swedish. Jim Henson would listen to the tape on his daily commutes, record himself practicing the tongue, then play back his performance to refine the speech pattern. Jim's son Brian Henson recalled how his father "would drive to work trying to make a chicken sandwich [or] a turkey casserole in mock Swedish. It was the most ridiculous thing you had ever seen, and people at traffic lights used to stop and sort of look at him a little crazy." Fellow Muppet writer and performer Jerry Juhl would later script the babble for the Chef sketches: "I come from good Danish stock, which Jim and I decided made me an expert in Scandinavian linguistics."

When interviewed on the subject in Swedish magazine Expressen in 1985, Jim Henson claimed that "one of my writers came up with the idea that the chef should sound like the Swedish actors in Ingmar Bergman films".

=== Potential inspirations ===
Juhl insisted the character had no real-world counterpart: "I wrote, rehearsed, rewrote, brainstormed, and giggled uncontrollably a thousand times with Jim Henson as we dealt with the Swedish Chef, and I never once heard him mention an actual Swedish chef." Nevertheless, a few thickly-accented television chefs have been claimed as inspirations for the character, including German American Chef Tell and Swedish chef Lars "Kuprik" Bäckman.

== Performance ==
The Swedish Chef is a variation of a live-hand Muppet. The Chef's lead performer, originally Jim Henson, uses his dominant hand to perform the character's head and mouth, and provides his mock Swedish dialogue. Both hands of a second puppeteer, originally Frank Oz, serve as those of the Chef – which, unusually for a Muppet, are actual human hands instead of puppet gloves. This allows the Chef to better interact with the food he prepares and the tools he uses.

In later years, the Chef was sometimes seen wearing a wedding ring; it belonged to Steve Whitmire, who performed the Chef's hands during the majority of Bill Barretta's tenure performing the voice and head. After Whitmire's departure from the Muppets, Peter Linz served as the Chef's hands.

== In Sweden and other countries ==
The Muppets have not had the same cultural impact in Sweden as in the United States. In Sweden, the Swedish Chef's name was translated as Svenske kocken, meaning the "Swedish cook". A 2012 Slate article stated that "the fact that his nonsense words are so widely interpreted as Swedish-sounding is bewildering and annoying to Swedes" and argued that Swedes don't find the character funny at all; the author Jeremy Stahl quoted his wife who said the character "doesn't sound Swedish, doesn't act Swedish, and there's nothing Swedish about him. He's not funny." The linguist Tomas Riad said "it's not funny for us to laugh at. It's funny for other people to laugh at." To many Swedes, the sing-song quality of the character's mock language is suggestive of Norwegian, not Swedish.

In the German-dubbed version of The Muppet Show, the Chef is Danish rather than Swedish, and his name is Smørrebrød Skagerrak.

== Appearances ==
Besides appearances in The Muppet Show, the chef also appears in The Muppet Movie (1979), The Great Muppet Caper (1981), The Muppets Take Manhattan (1984), The Muppets: A Celebration of 30 Years (1986), A Muppet Family Christmas (1987), Muppet*Vision 3D (1991), an attraction found at Disney's Hollywood Studios, The Muppet Christmas Carol (1992), Muppet Treasure Island (1996), Muppets From Space (1999), It's a Very Merry Muppet Christmas Movie (2002), The Muppets' Wizard of Oz (2005), Studio DC: Almost Live (2008), a sketch for the cast of The Suite Life of Zack & Cody and an episode with Hannah Montana star Jason Earles and Cory in the House star Jason Dolley, the Muppet viral video "Popcorn" (2010), The Muppets (2011), Muppets Most Wanted (2014), a regular role on The Muppets (2015), and also appearing as a guest alongside Miss Piggy on the 5th season of MasterChef Junior (2017). A younger version of the Swedish Chef appeared on the Disney Junior series Muppet Babies where he was referred to simply as Chef. The Swedish Chef has also appeared in a 2013 "This is SportsCenter" commercial with Robert Flores, Henrik Lundqvist, Steve Levy, and Linda Cohn. He appears in Muppets Now on the segment "Økėÿ Døkęÿ Køøkïñ" in which he competes against celebrity chefs. In 2020, he appeared in the cooking simulation video game Overcooked: All You Can Eat as a playable character. Swedish Chef appears as a playable character in Disney Heroes: Battle Mode, a mobile game featuring Disney characters.

== Casting history ==
=== Main performers ===
- Jim Henson: The Muppet Show: Sex and Violence – The Muppets at Walt Disney World
- Bill Barretta: Muppet Treasure Island – present

=== Other performers ===
- David Rudman: The Muppet Christmas Carol
- Steve Whitmire: A Streetcar Named Desire – I Love Lucy Movie Mania (Screen Tests)
- Victor Yerrid: From the Balcony: Episode 26

== See also ==
- Cröonchy Stars
- Swedish cuisine
- De Düva
