= The Great Santa Claus Switch =

1970 film by John Moffitt

- Written by: Jerry Juhl
- Directed by: John Moffitt
- Starring: Art Carney; Muppet performers: Jim Henson; Fran Brill; Richard Hunt; John Lovelady; Jerry Nelson; Frank Oz; Danny Seagren
- Narrated by: Ed Sullivan
- Music by: Joe Raposo
- Country of origin: United States
- Original language: English

Production
- Producer: Bob Precht
- Editor: Ken Champin
- Production companies: Sullivan Productions, Inc.

Original release
- Network: CBS
- Release: December 20, 1970

The Great Santa Claus Switch is a musical Christmas special featuring Jim Henson's Muppets. It first aired on CBS on December 20, 1970, as an episode of The Ed Sullivan Show. It was directed by John Moffitt, written by Jerry Juhl, with music by Joe Raposo and puppets by Don Sahlin.

== Plot ==
The special, narrated by Ed Sullivan, begins at the North Pole with Santa Claus and his Christmas Elves getting ready for another Christmas. However, Cosmo Scam has hatched a plan to kidnap Santa and take his place. As part of the plan, Cosmo plans to abduct Santa's Christmas Elves one by one and replace them with his evil henchmen.

== Cast ==
- Art Carney as Santa Claus, Cosmo Scam
- Ed Sullivan as himself

=== Muppet performers ===
- Jim Henson as Fred the Christmas Elf, Lothar
- Frank Oz as Thig, Boppity, Hoppity the Christmas Elf, Snerf
- Jerry Nelson as Thog, Snivelly, Zippity the Christmas Elf
- Richard Hunt as Bing the Christmas Elf, Matchbox Frackle, Guard Frackle
- Fran Brill as Green Bird Frackle
- John Lovelady as Alarm Frackle, Bong the Christmas Elf, Scoff, Snake Frackle, Snerf
- Danny Seagren as Snarl (early version of Gonzo), Skippity the Christmas Elf, Snerf
- Greg Antonacchi as Gloat

Additional Muppets performed by Cary Antebi, John Byrum, Marilyn Sokol, and Byron Whiting.

== Songs ==
1. "We're Happy Little Christmas Elves"
2. "I Want to Help"
3. "A Bundle To Be Made"
4. "It's Christmas Time"
5. "Rock Music"
6. "It's Christmas Time (Reprise)"
