= Squeak! =

- The "Tick Tock Clock" with titles
- Genre: Children's television
- Created by: Adrian Edwards; Mike James
- Developed by: Scottish Television
- Written by: Adrian Edwards; Alex Reid; Mike James
- Directed by: Adrian Edwards; Penny Welsford
- Creative director: Callum McCulloch
- Starring: Colin Purves; Lynn Robertson Bruce; Kim Bergsagel
- Voices of: Jo James; Gayanne Potter; Colin Purves; Ian Sexon; Peter Linz; Sondra James; Sandra Dickinson; Tyler Bunch
- Theme music composer: Mike James
- Opening theme: Tog Toot And Tizzy
- Ending theme: Bye Bye Bye
- Composer: Mike James
- Country of origin: Scotland
- Original language: English
- No. of episodes: 50

Production
- Producer: Adrian Edwards
- Running time: 20 minutes
- Production company: SMG TV Productions

Original release
- Network: ITV (CITV)
- Release: 30 June 2003

Related
- The Singing Kettle

Squeak! is a children's TV show made by SMG Productions (now known as STV Studios) for ITV's children's strand CITV. The series re-broadcast in 2007 on STV, on their wknd@stv strand, and from 2014 as part of the "Weans' World" block on STV Glasgow and STV Edinburgh. There is a DVD boxset available which features all the episodes. Squeak! was formerly broadcast in the United States on BabyFirst TV from 2006 to 2023.

The show follows three young mice: Tizzy, Toot and Tog. They live in the "Tick Tock Clock".
