= John Lovelady =

American puppeteer (born 1931)

- Born: August 11, 1931 (age 95)
- Occupation: Puppeteer
- Known for: Working on The Muppet Show, Sesame Street, and The Great Space Coaster
- Awards: Primetime Emmy Award for Outstanding Individual Achievement in Creative Technical Crafts

John Lovelady (born August 11, 1935) is an American retired puppeteer who worked with the Muppets, including on the PBS series Sesame Street. Lovelady is originally from Oxford, Mississippi. He was one of the puppeteer troupe in the first season of The Muppet Show (1976–77).

He later joined the syndicated children's series The Great Space Coaster, puppeteered for Mother Goose's Treasury, and also performed on the series Adventures in Wonderland.

== Filmography ==
- The Great Santa Claus Switch - Bong, Scoff, Additional Muppets
- The Frog Prince (Muppets) - Additional Muppets
- The Muppet Musicians of Bremen - Additional Muppets
- The Muppets Valentine Show - Crazy Donald, Additional Muppets
- The Muppet Show: Sex and Violence - Abraham Lincoln, Vanity, Additional Muppets
- The Muppet Show - Crazy Harry, Nigel, Svengali (episode 103), Iggy Wiggy, Additional Muppets
- Adventures in Wonderland (Disney): The Dormouse
- Dumbo's Circus (Disney): Flap
- D.C. Follies (syndicated): Ronald Reagan
- Mr. Smith (NBC): Mr. Smith
- The Great Space Coaster (syndicated): Edison The Elephant, Knock Knock the Woodpecker (Seasons 1, 2, 3)

Media offices
Preceded by None	Performer of Crazy Harry; 1974, 1976–1977	Succeeded by Jerry Nelson
