= Billy Bunny's Animal Songs =

- Directed by: David Gumpel
- Written by: Jim Lewis; Bill Prady
- Produced by: Alex Rockwell; Ritamarie Peruggi
- Starring: Fran Brill; Kevin Clash; Richard Hunt; Jim Martin; Joey Mazzarino; Kathryn Mullen; Jerry Nelson; Carmen Osbahr; David Rudman; Steve Whitmire
- Music by: Jimmy Hammer; Dave Kinnion
- Production company: Jim Henson Productions
- Distributed by: Buena Vista Home Video
- Release date: May 21, 1993
- Running time: 30 minutes
- Country: United States
- Language: English

Billy Bunny's Animal Songs (also known as Muppet Sing Alongs: Billy Bunny's Animal Songs) is an American direct-to-video musical film featuring The Muppets. It is the first direct-to-video feature film in The Muppets franchise. It was the first of the titles in the Muppet Sing-Alongs series filmed in 1990 before production on The Muppets Celebrate Jim Henson and released on May 21, 1993. This film was credited as one of Carmen Osbahr's first projects with the Muppets, and also served as one of Richard Hunt's final works, as he died in 1992.

== Plot ==
Kermit the Frog welcomes the viewer to the Muppet Sing-Along Video and allows us to hear a story about a bunny who travels outside his home to learn new songs from his animal friends and to sing-along to them.

The story begins when Billy Bunny is at his family home, singing "Hoppity-Boppity" - the only song he knows, much to the dismay of his family. Billy's mother advises him that if he goes outside to learn new songs from others, nobody will have to keep hearing Billy's same old song. Billy accepts and as he leaves, his mom has him promise to be home for dinner.

Billy first stops by at a gopher village, where he discovers that every gopher looks the same, despite them having different personalities ("We Are Different"). Next, he meets three polite bears - Cecil, Edgar and Percival - who sing a rap about their personalities and why they roar ("Bear Rap").

Next, Billy meets a termite, who sings about his joy in eating wood ("The Termite Chew"). As Billy enters a deep forest, he meets two raccoons, who are pretending to be someone else. When he asks them what they are doing here in the woods, they explain that it is a secret and they sing about it ("I Have a Secret").

Next, Billy accidentally bumps into a porcupine. He seems to be fine, but the porcupine invites him to her nightclub and sings "Please Don't Bump into Me", about less harmful things to bump into, such as a beagle and a kangaroo.

Next, Billy goes over to a pond, where he meets some frogs, who sing about their "Frog Talk". Finally, Billy meets a turtle who sings "Swim Away, Hooray!" - and Billy joins in with him. It is now late and Billy has to go home.

When Billy comes home just in time for dinner, he explains to his family that he knows eight songs, and the one song that is his favorite is "Hoppity-Boppity". Billy's family joins in with him and Kermit thanks the viewers for singing along with Billy. All the animals reprise "Hoppity-Boppity" together.

== Cast ==
=== Muppet performers ===
- Kevin Clash - Billy Bunny
- Fran Brill - Frog, Porcupine
- Richard Hunt - Edgar Bear, Raccoon
- Jerry Nelson - Cecil Bear, Frog, Raccoon, Turtle
- Rick Lyon
- Jim Martin - Frog, Gopher, Father Rabbit
- Joey Mazzarino - Frog, Gopher
- Kathryn Mullen - Mother Bunny, Frog, Gopher
- Carmen Osbahr - Gopher
- David Rudman - Frog, Gopher, Penguin, Percival Bear, Termite
- Steve Whitmire - Kermit the Frog
