= The Frog Prince (1971 film) =

1971 TV special directed by Jim Henson

- 1994 VHS cover art
- Genre: Fantasy; Comedy; Musical
- Created by: Jim Henson
- Written by: Jerry Juhl
- Directed by: Jim Henson
- Starring: Trudy Young; Gordon Thomson; Carl Banas; Muppet performers: Jerry Nelson; Jim Henson; Frank Oz; Jerry Juhl
- Theme music composer: Jerry Juhl (lyrics); Joe Raposo
- Countries of origin: United States; Canada

Production
- Executive producer: John T. Ross
- Producer: Jim Henson
- Editors: Frank Lorenowicz; Dino Digregorio
- Running time: 51 minutes
- Production companies: Robert Lawrence Productions; Muppets, Inc.

Original release
- Network: Television syndication
- Release: May 12, 1971

The Frog Prince (released on home video as Tales from Muppetland: The Frog Prince) is a 1971 musical fantasy comedy television special directed by Jim Henson, and jointly produced by Robert Lawrence Productions in Canada and Muppets, Inc. in the United States. It is a retelling of the Brothers Grimm's classic fairy tale of "The Frog Prince" featuring Kermit the Frog as the narrator, Kermit's nephew Robin as Sir Robin the Frog Prince, and Sweetums. This special marked the debut of both Robin and Sweetums to the world of The Muppets.

== Plot ==
After a brief introductory scene, Kermit the Frog and several other frogs sit around a well, when a small frog they do not recognize appears. The frog introduces himself as Sir Robin the Brave, explaining that he is actually a prince. He recounts, through a flashback narrated in song, that he once fought an ogre and was transformed into a frog by a witch, who told him the only way to break the spell was to be kissed by a princess.

Nearby, the frogs overhear King Rupert proclaiming that he will retire as king that afternoon, and that his daughter, Princess Melora, will be crowned queen. While Robin is excited for his opportunity to return to his human form, Kermit and the other frogs exhort the simple pleasures of a frog's life in song.

Princess Melora comes to the well, and Robin learns that she is under an enchantment that prevents anyone from understanding what she says, hearing her speech in spoonerisms. Melora tries to explain to her father that the spell was put on her by her aunt, Taminella. However, Melora's enchantment makes her pronounce "Aunt Taminella" as "Taunt Aminella," and her father cannot understand her.

As Melora sits by the well, singing to herself, she accidentally drops a ball into the water. Robin offers to retrieve it for her if Melora agrees to take him to the palace. Melora agrees and Robin fetches the ball.

At the palace, Melora speaks to Taminella while Robin hides in Melora's basket. Robin asks Melora to kiss him, explaining that he can understand her speech. Robin and Melora reprise Melora's earlier song.

Taminella barges in, recognizing Robin and telling Melora not to kiss the frog, sending her out of the room. While alone with Robin, Taminella reveals her plan to feed him to the ogre.

In the next scene, Robin explains to Melora that he knows that Taminella enchanted Melora when Melora discovered Taminella to be a witch, so Melora wouldn't be able to warn anyone. Melora tells Robin that the only way to destroy Taminella's power is to "bake the hall in the candle of her brain," but Robin does not understand her, and Melora and Robin are interrupted by Taminella once again.

Rupert II, Taminella, Melora, and Robin gather for a banquet, and are served by Featherstone. When Rupert II laments that he wants to know who cast the spell on Melora, she points across the table at Taminella, shouting "Taunt Aminella! Taunt Aminella!", and is still misunderstood by her father. Rupert II recounts his first time meeting Taminella, when he encountered her in the woods, and she, recognizing him to be the king, introduced herself as his long-lost sister. Taminella reveals to Melora that she has agreed to take the throne in Melora's place. Melora and Robin try to protest, but Melora's father doesn't understand her speech, and Robin is silenced by Taminella, who stuffs his mouth with popovers.

After the banquet, Taminella takes Robin to the dungeon in a cage, and gives him to Sweetums, the ogre, to eat. Robin evades being eaten by lulling Sweetums to sleep with a lullaby. Kermit arrives to free Robin, but is unable to open Robin's cage. Kermit and Robin attempt to make Sweetums open Robin's cage in his sleep. However, after he does, he immediately wakes up intent on eating Robin, revealing his intentions in song.

Kermit and Robin escape just in time for the coronation. Kermit and the frogs help Robin disrupt the coronation. Amid the chaos, Robin realizes that what Melora has been asking of him is, "Break the ball in the handle of her cane." He bites Taminella on the arm, causing her to drop her cane and shatter the glass ball in its handle. Taminella's power destroyed, she turns into a bird and flies away. Melora's enchantment is broken, and she kisses Robin. Robin turns back into a prince and professes his love for Melora. Melora is crowned queen while the audience sings.

Back at the well some time later, Kermit reveals that Robin and Melora are married and have a baby boy they have named after their dear friend, much to Kermit's delight. Kermit swims in the well as the credits roll.

== Notes ==
Later syndicated alongside The Muppet Show.

== Cast ==
- Trudy Young as Princess Melora
- Gordon Thomson as Sir Robin the Brave
- Heather Henson as Baby Prince Kermit

=== Muppet performers ===
- Jerry Nelson as Robin the Frog (voice), Featherstone, Sweetums (in-suit performer)
- Jim Henson as Kermit the Frog, Garth the Frog, King Rupert the Second
- Frank Oz as Gawain the Frog, Robin the Frog (puppeteer)
- Carl Banas as Sweetums (voice)
- Richard Hunt as Taminella Grinderfall (in-suit performer)
- Jerry Juhl as Kay the Frog, Taminella Grinderfall (voice)

Additional Muppets performed by Faz Fazakas, John Lovelady, and Danny Seagren.

== Home media ==
The Frog Prince was first released on LP, then VHS, Betamax and LaserDisc in the United States in 1983 by the Walt Disney Telecommunications and Non-Theatrical Company through the Muppet Home Video imprint. A CED release was also issued by RCA.

On January 14, 1994, Buena Vista Home Video through the Jim Henson Video imprint re-released the special on VHS.
