= Jim Lewis (writer) =

American writer (born 1955)

- Born: James Lewis; December 23, 1955 (age 69)
- Occupation: Television writer

James "Jim" Lewis (born December 23, 1955) is an American writer known for his work with The Jim Henson Company and The Muppets. Lewis first worked with the Muppets as the editor of Muppet Magazine. The Disney Channel program Studio DC: Almost Live was produced by him.

Lewis grew up in Boonton, New Jersey, and attended Boonton High School.

== Writing credits ==
- Wow, You're a Cartoonist! (1988)
- Hey, You're as Funny as Fozzie Bear (1988)
- The Jim Henson Hour - Miss Piggy's Hollywood (with Bill Prady) (1989)
- Muppet Sing Alongs (1993)
- The Animal Show (1994-1996)
- Muppet Time (1994)
- Muppet Classic Theater (with Bill Prady) (1994)
- Muppets Tonight (1996)
- Telling Stories with Tomie dePaola (2001)
- Kermit's Swamp Years (2002)
- The Muppet Show Live (2001)
- It's A Very Merry Muppet Christmas Movie (2002)
- The Muppets Present...Great Moments in American History (2016)
- The Muppets Take the Bowl (with Kirk Thatcher, Andrew Williams and Matthew Barnette, live show at the Hollywood Bowl in 2017)
- The Muppets Take the O2 (with Kirk Thatcher, Andrew Williams and Matthew Barnette, live show at the O2 Arena in 2018)
- Muppets Now (Story Team, 2020)
- Muppets Haunted Mansion (2021)
