= The Muppets at Walt Disney World =

1990 television special

- Based on: The Muppets by Jim Henson Mickey Mouse by Walt Disney
- Written by: Jerry Juhl
- Directed by: Peter Harris
- Starring: The Muppets; Charles Grodin; Raven-Symoné
- Voices of: Wayne Allwine
- Country of origin: United States
- Original language: English

Production
- Executive producer: Jim Henson
- Producers: Martin G. Baker; Diana Birkenfield
- Production location: Walt Disney World (Lake Buena Vista, Florida)
- Running time: 47 minutes
- Production companies: Jim Henson Productions; Walt Disney Television

Original release
- Network: NBC
- Release: May 6, 1990

The Muppets at Walt Disney World is a television special starring Jim Henson's Muppets at Walt Disney World in Lake Buena Vista, Florida. The special aired on NBC as part of The Magical World of Disney on May 6, 1990, ten days prior to Henson's death.

== Prelude ==
At the start of The Magical World of Disney, then-Disney CEO Michael Eisner talks about the special while having tea with Fozzie Bear and his mother Emily in the lobby of the Grand Floridian Beach Resort. After Fozzie accidentally gets butter on Eisner's sleeve, Gonzo shows up with a group of Muppet monsters and Frackles to clean up Eisner's suit.

== Plot ==
In this television special, the Muppets are visiting Kermit's family for their annual reunion where they meet up with Kermit's aunts and uncles. When the others learn that the swamp is right next to Walt Disney World, they sneak in, and are pursued by a security guard named Quentin Fitzwaller (played by Charles Grodin). Attractions and areas featured include Big Thunder Mountain Railroad, the Indiana Jones Epic Stunt Spectacular!, Star Tours, the Mad Tea Party, World Showcase, the Walt Disney World Monorail System and the utilidors. The special depicts the three parks (Magic Kingdom, Epcot and Disney-MGM Studios) as one connected area.

The story ends with the Muppets having a friendly meeting at Mickey Mouse's office where Mickey and Kermit compare their company's theme songs, "When You Wish Upon a Star" and "The Rainbow Connection" and the ideals behind them. After that, the Muppets return to the swamp, but find out about Miss Piggy remaining stuck in front of The Great Movie Ride with her feet in the cement. They return to Walt Disney World for her afterwards to free her. While stuck in the cement, Miss Piggy shouts for help as the credits roll.

== Cast ==
=== Human cast ===
- Charles Grodin as Quentin Fitzwaller
- Raven-Symoné as Little Girl
- Michael Eisner as Himself

=== Voice cast ===
- Wayne Allwine as Mickey Mouse

=== Muppet performers ===
- Jim Henson as Kermit the Frog, Rowlf the Dog, Dr. Teeth, Link Hogthrob, the Swedish Chef, Waldorf
- Frank Oz as Miss Piggy, Fozzie Bear, and Animal
- Jerry Nelson as Robin the Frog, Camilla the Chicken, Floyd Pepper, Ma Bear, Frog #1
- Richard Hunt as Scooter, Janice, Beaker, Statler, Frog #2
- Dave Goelz as Gonzo the Great, Dr. Bunsen Honeydew, Beauregard, Zoot, Frog #3
- Steve Whitmire as Rizzo the Rat, Bean Bunny, Lips, Frog #4
- Kevin Clash as Clifford, Alligator, Frog #5
- Camille Bonora as Frog #6, Additional Muppets
- David Rudman as Frog #7, Additional Muppets
- Additional Muppets performed by Rickey Boyd, Rick Lyon, Jim Martin and Joey Mazzarino

== Songs ==
1. "Knee Deep"
2. "Rockin' All Around the World"
3. "Who's Your Lady Friend?"
4. "I'm Doggin' It"
5. "Rainbow Connection"
6. "Love in a Laundromat"
7. "More, More, More"

== Promotion ==
On May 4, 1990, Jim Henson appeared on The Arsenio Hall Show to promote the special with Kermit the Frog. Henson was joined by Kevin Clash, performing Clifford. It would be Henson's last live television appearance, and the last known time he performed Kermit the Frog.

== Production notes ==
This was the last Muppet special Jim Henson worked on. It aired ten days prior to his death on May 16.

During "Rockin' All Around the World" (in melody of Status Quo's "Rockin' All Over the World"), Muppets inspired by the Audio-Animatronic dolls from the It's a Small World attraction appear at the end of the number. In addition, costumed characters consisting of the dwarfs and Snow White from Snow White and the Seven Dwarfs (1937), Brer Bear from Song of the South (1946), Bongo and Lulubelle from Fun and Fancy Free (1947), and Liver Lips McGrowl and Wendell from the Country Bear Jamboree attraction have cameos.
