= Peter Linz =

American puppeteer (b. 1967)

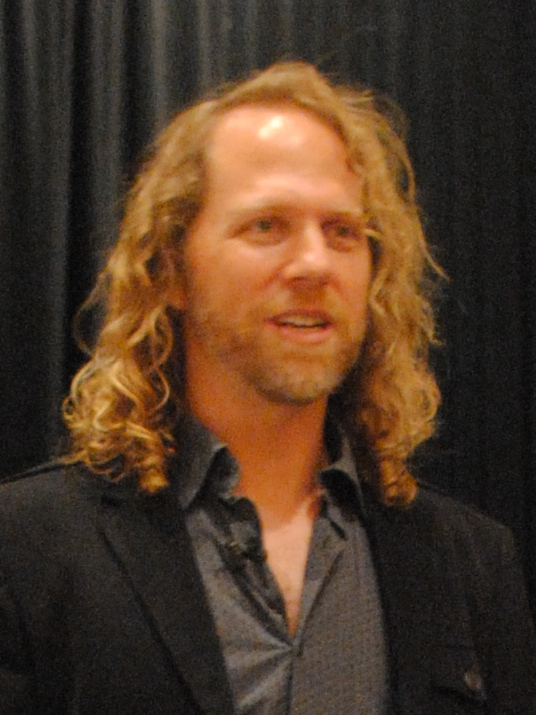
- Linz at the 2011 Dragon Con
- Born: June 28, 1967 (age 59); Decatur, Georgia, U.S.
- Other name: George Bailey
- Occupation: Puppeteer
- Years active: 1989–present
- Spouses: Marlene E. Rudy (m. 1993; died 2016) Alice Dinnean (m. 2023)
- Children: 3

Peter Linz (born June 28, 1967) is an American puppeteer. Known for his work with the Muppets, Linz's most prominent role is performing for the character Walter who was introduced in the 2011 feature film The Muppets. Since 1991, Linz has performed on Sesame Street, on which he performs Herry Monster and Ernie.

After Steve Whitmire was fired from the Muppets in 2016 he would take over his roles as Statler, Lips, and Link Hogthrob.

== Early life ==
Peter Linz was born on June 28, 1967 in Decatur, Georgia.

== Career ==
Linz has performed many characters on children's television shows, including Snook in It's a Big Big World, Tutter and Pip in Bear in the Big Blue House, Pooh in The Book of Pooh, Tizzy on Squeak! (season 1), Theo Lion in Between the Lions, Honkers, Osvaldo, el Gruñón, Yo-Yol, Bif, Herry Monster and Ernie in Sesame Street and addition roles in Blue's Room and The Puzzle Place. Following Steve Whitmire's departure from the Muppets, Linz has performed the roles of Statler, Link Hogthrob, Robin the Frog, and Lips.

Linz also performed in the Broadway musical Avenue Q, and provided the voice of Moz in the English dub of Sheep and Wolves.

== Personal life ==
Linz was previously married to Marlene E. Rudy from 1993 until her death in 2016; together they have three children. He married puppeteer Alice Dinnean in 2023.

== Filmography ==
=== Film ===
Year	Title	Role	Notes
1999	Muppets from Space	Shakes, Beach Hippie, Additional Muppets	Assistant performer, cameo appearance
2011	The Muppets	Walter	Performer
2011	KikoRiki: Team Invincible	Krash	English dub; credited as George Bailey
2013	Scooby-Doo! Adventures: The Mystery Map	Phantom Parrot, Gnarlybeard, Stu Stukowski, Lighthouse Lou	Puppeteer; Direct-to-video film
2014	Muppets Most Wanted	Walter, Manolo Flamingo, Prisoner, Baby	Performer
2016	Sheep and Wolves	Moz	English dub

=== Television ===
Year(s)	Title	Role	Notes
1991–present	Sesame Street	Ernie (2017–present), Herry Monster (2015–present), Additional Muppets	Performer
1993	Sesame Street Stays Up Late!	Additional Muppets	Performer; PBS special
1994	Muppet Sing-Alongs: It's Not Easy Being Green	Goldfish	Performer; Direct-to-video special
1994–1998	The Puzzle Place	Skye, Nuzzle	Performer (season 1–2)
1996	Aliens in the Family	Varch, Elder of the Nertron Galactic Federation, Red Yukkle	Performer
1997–2006	Bear in the Big Blue House	Tutter, Pip, Jack the Dog, Skippy, Jacques the Beaver, Luna the Moon (puppetry only), Shadow (puppetry only), Ray the Sun (puppetry only)	Performer
1997	Sesame Street: Kids' Guide to Life: Telling the Truth	Additional Muppets	Performer; Direct-to-video special
1998	Elmopalooza!	Additional Muppets	Performer; ABC special
2000–2010	Between the Lions	Theo Lion, Heath the Thesaurus (season 2–4), Announcer Bunny, Gawain	Performer
2001–2004	The Book of Pooh	Winnie the Pooh	Puppeter
2003–2004	Fisher-Price Baby Development Videos	Dee	Performer; Direct-to-video specials
2002–2020	Squeak!	Tizzy	English dub
2004–2005	Blue's Room	Polka Dots, Doodle Board	Performer (season 1)
2006–2010	It's a Big Big World	Snook, Oko	Performer
2007–2011	WordWorld	Bug, Pig, Monkey	Voice; credited as George Bailey
2008	Abby in Wonderland	Additional Muppets	Performer
2008	Lomax, the Hound of Music	Lomax the Hound	Performer
2008	A Muppet Christmas: Letters to Santa	Additional Muppets	Performer
2010, 2011	30 Rock	Puppeteer #1, Additional Muppets	Performer; 2 episodes
2012	Pokémon the Series: Black & White	Angus	English dub; credited as George Bailey
2015–2016	The Muppets	Gloria Estefan, Droop, Snowth	Performer
2020	Muppets Now	Joe the Legal Weasel, Walter, Robin the Frog, Statler, Link Hogthrob, Foo-Foo	Performer
2021–present	Donkey Hodie	Clyde the Cloud	Performer
2021	Muppets Haunted Mansion	Walter, Joe the Legal Weasel, Statler, Robin the Frog, Lips, Ghost	Performer; Disney+ special
2023	The Muppets Mayhem	Lips, Statler	Performer
2026	The Muppet Show	Statler, Robin the Frog (uncredited), Lips	Performer; Disney+ special

=== Other appearances ===
Year	Title	Role	Notes
2013	Sesame Street Spaghetti Space Chase	Elmo	Voice (opening ceremony); theme park ride
2017	The Muppets Take the Bowl	Walter, Robin the Frog, Statler, Link Hogthrob, Lips, Snowth	Performer; live show at the Hollywood Bowl
2018	The Muppets Take the O2	Walter, Robin the Frog, Statler, Link Hogthrob, Lips, Snowth	Performer; live show at the O2 Arena
2021	The Muppets Christmas Caroling Coach	Statler	Voice; theme park show at Disneyland
2025	World of Color Happiness!	Joe the Legal Weasel, Lips, Statler	Performer (prerecorded footage); theme park pre-show
2026	Rock 'n' Roller Coaster: Starring The Muppets	Walter, Joe the Legal Weasel, Lips, Statler, Robin the Frog	Performer (Audio-Animatronic voice and prerecorded footage); theme park attraction

Preceded by None	Walter (Muppet); 2011–present	Succeeded by None
Preceded by Tyler Bunch	Performer of Herry Monster; 2015–present	Succeeded by None
Preceded by Steve Whitmire	Performer of Statler; 2017–present	Succeeded by None
Preceded by Matt Vogel	Performer of Robin the Frog; 2017–present	Succeeded by None
Preceded by Steve Whitmire	Performer of Link Hogthrob; 2017–present	Succeeded by None
Preceded by Steve Whitmire	Performer of Lips; 2017–present	Succeeded by None
Preceded by Billy Barkhurst	Performer of Ernie; 2017–present	Succeeded by None
Preceded by Richard Hunt	Performer of Captain Vegetable; 2019–present	Succeeded by None
Preceded by Joey Mazzarino	Performer of Horatio the Elephant; 2019–present	Succeeded by None
