= Matt Vogel (puppeteer) =

American puppeteer and director (born 1970)

- Born: Matthew James Vogel; October 6, 1970 (age 56); Kansas City, Kansas, U.S.
- Other name: Daryl Ekroth
- Education: Webster University (BFA)
- Occupations: Puppeteer; actor; director
- Years active: 1993–present
- Spouse: Kelly C. McDonnell (m. 1997)
- Children: 5
- Website: www.mattvogel.com

Matthew James Vogel (born October 6, 1970) is an American puppeteer, actor and director. He is known for his work with Sesame Workshop and the Muppets. He has performed Kermit the Frog since 2017, and has been the full-time performer of Big Bird since 2018 and Count von Count since 2013.

== Early life ==
Vogel was born on October 6, 1970, in Kansas City, Kansas and is a graduate of Turner High School. As a child, he was a fan of Sesame Street and The Muppet Show. In 1993, he interned at Mesner Puppet Theater where he played his first role of Victor Frankenstein in Paul Mesner Puppets' production of Frankenstein. The following year, he moved from Kansas City to New York. He received a Bachelor of Fine Arts in Theatre from The Conservatory of Theatre Arts at Webster University.

== Career ==
Vogel began his career with the Jim Henson Company in 1996, joining Sesame Street as an ensemble puppeteer and understudy performer for Big Bird. In 2018, he became the full-time performer for Big Bird following Caroll Spinney's retirement. Since 2008, he has additionally served as a director on the program and was appointed puppet captain in 2012. Following Jerry Nelson's death the same year, he inherited the role of Count von Count. He has additionally performed Mr. Johnson, Forgetful Jones, Sherlock Hemlock, and the Yip-Yip Martians.

Since 2008, Vogel has been a performer with the Muppets, inheriting many of Nelson's character roles. He has performed the characters Floyd Pepper, Uncle Deadly, Lew Zealand, Crazy Harry, Sweetums, Camilla the Chicken, Dr. Julius Strangepork, Pops, '80s Robot, and Constantine. In July 2017, he was officially announced as the new performer for Kermit the Frog, succeeding Steve Whitmire in the role. His first performance as Kermit was in a "Muppets Thought of the Week" segment on YouTube. He performed Robin the Frog until 2017 with Peter Linz taking over the role to allow Kermit and Robin to appear in scenes together.

Vogel voiced Wilkins in the 2016 film Alice Through the Looking Glass.

== Personal life ==
Vogel married Kelly C. McDonnell on August 31, 1997. They have five children.

== Filmography ==
=== Film ===
Year	Title	Role	Notes
1999	The Adventures of Elmo in Grouchland	Big Bird	Assistant performer
2005	The Producers	Pigeon	Puppeteer
2008	A Muppets Christmas: Letters to Santa	Floyd Pepper, Camilla the Chicken, Lew Zealand, Robin the Frog, Pigeon Son	Performer; Television film
2011	The Muppets	Uncle Deadly, Floyd Pepper, Sweetums, Lew Zealand, Crazy Harry, Camilla the Chicken, and Robin the Frog	Performer
2013	Scooby-Doo! Adventures: The Mystery Map	Fred Jones	Puppeteer; Direct-to-video film
2014	Muppets Most Wanted	Constantine, Floyd Pepper, Sweetums, Pops, Robin the Frog, Lew Zealand, Crazy Harry, '80s Robot, Camilla the Chicken, and Uncle Deadly	Performer
2014	I Am Big Bird: The Caroll Spinney Story		Documentary film; Self
2016	Alice Through the Looking Glass	Wilkins	Voice

=== Television ===
Year(s)	Title	Role	Notes
1996–present	Sesame Street	Big Bird (1997–present), Count von Count (2013–present), Mr. Johnson (2014–present), Various characters	Performer (also director)
1996	Elmo Saves Christmas		Additional performer; Television special
1996–98	Big Bag		Additional performer
1998	The Puzzle Place	Skye, Nuzzle	Performer (season 3)
2000	Between the Lions	Various characters	Ensemble performer
2002–07	Play with Me Sesame	Ernie	Assistant performer
2003–05	Oobi	Angus	Performer
2006	Blue's Room	Alphabet Puppy	Puppeteer
2007	Jack's Big Music Show	Leonard the Country Squirrel	Performer, Episode: "Leonard the Country Squirrel"
2007–11	WordWorld	Frog	Voice role; credited as Daryl Ekroth
2008	Studio DC: Almost Live	Camilla the Chicken, Floyd Pepper (puppetry only)	Performer
2009	30 Rock		Puppeteer, Episode: "Apollo, Apollo"
2015–16	The Muppets	Uncle Deadly, Floyd Pepper, Sweetums, Lew Zealand, Crazy Harry, Camilla the Chicken, Robin the Frog	Performer
2016	The Furchester Hotel	Big Bird, Count von Count	Performer
2016	Once Upon a Sesame Street Christmas	Count von Count, Constable/Mr. Johnson, Big Bird (puppetry only)	Performer (also director); Television special
2019	Lip Sync Battle	Big Bird	Performer
2020–21	The Not-Too-Late Show with Elmo	Count von Count, Big Bird, Biff, Mr. Johnson	Performer (also director)
2020	Amphibia	Crumpet the Frog	Voice role, Episode: "Swamp and Sensibility" Credited as Kermit the Frog
2020	Muppets Now	Kermit the Frog, Uncle Deadly, Floyd Pepper, Camilla the Chicken, Cacti	Performer
2021–23	The Masked Singer	Snail (as Kermit the Frog), Crazy Harry, Uncle Deadly, Big Bird, Count von Count	3 episodes; Contestant (season 5) Episodes: "Muppets Night", "Sesame Street Night"
2021	Donkey Hodie	King Friday	Performer
2021	A Capitol Fourth	Kermit the Frog	Performer; Television special
2021	Muppets Haunted Mansion	Kermit the Frog, Floyd Pepper, Pops, Crazy Harry, Lew Zealand, Uncle Deadly, Sweetums	Performer; Disney+ Halloween special
2022	Best in Snow	Kermit the Frog	Performer; Disney+ special
2023	The Muppets Mayhem	Floyd Pepper	Performer; Main role
2026	The Muppet Show	Kermit the Frog, Floyd Pepper, Pops (uncredited), Crazy Harry (uncredited), Lew Zealand (uncredited), Uncle Deadly (uncredited), Sweetums (uncredited)	Performer (also executive producer); Television special

=== Video games ===
Year	Title	Role(s)	Notes
2000	Muppet RaceMania	Scooter, Janice	
2002	Sesame Street Toddler	Big Bird	
2011	Sesame Street: iYip	Martian #1	
2023	Disney Speedstorm	Kermit the Frog	

=== Other appearances ===
Year	Title	Role(s)	Notes
2017	The Muppets Take the Bowl	Kermit the Frog, Uncle Deadly, Floyd Pepper, Lew Zealand, Crazy Harry, Camilla the Chicken, Dr. Julius Strangepork, Snowth, Sweetums (voice)	Performer, live show at the Hollywood Bowl, Sept. 8–10
2018	The Muppets Take the O2	Kermit the Frog, Uncle Deadly, Floyd Pepper, Lew Zealand, Crazy Harry, Camilla the Chicken, Dr. Julius Strangepork, Snowth, Sweetums (voice)	Performer, live show at the O2, Jul. 13–14
2019	Muppet Babies Play Date	Kermit the Frog (baby)	Performer (puppetry only)
2021	The Muppets Christmas Caroling Coach	Kermit the Frog, Camilla the Chicken	Voice, theme park show
2023	Disney Holidays in Hollywood	Kermit the Frog	Voice, theme park show
2025	World of Color Happiness!	Kermit the Frog, Floyd Pepper, Camilla the Chicken	Performer (prerecorded footage), theme park show
2026	Rock 'n' Roller Coaster Starring The Muppets	Kermit the Frog, Uncle Deadly, Floyd Pepper, Lew Zealand, Crazy Harry, Camilla the Chicken, Dr. Julius Strangepork, Snowth, Sweetums	Performer (prerecorded footage); theme park attraction

Preceded by Adam Hunt	Performer of Scooter; 2000	Succeeded by Brian Henson
Preceded by Richard Hunt	Performer of Janice; 2000	Succeeded by Brian Henson
Preceded by Alice Dinnean	Performer of Camilla the Chicken; 2008–present	Succeeded by None
Preceded by None	'80s Robot; 2011–present	Succeeded by None
Preceded by Rickey Boyd	Performer of Crazy Harry; 2008–present	Succeeded by None
Preceded by Jerry Nelson	Performer of Floyd Pepper; 2008–present	Succeeded by None
Preceded by Jerry Nelson	Performer of Lew Zealand; 2008–present	Succeeded by None
Preceded by Jerry Nelson	Performer of Robin the Frog; 2008–17	Succeeded by Peter Linz
Preceded by Noel MacNeal	Performer of Sweetums; 2009–present	Succeeded by None
Preceded by Jerry Nelson	Performer of Pops; 2011–present	Succeeded by None
Preceded by Jerry Nelson	Performer of Uncle Deadly; 2011–present	Succeeded by None
Preceded by Jerry Nelson	Performer of Count von Count; 2013–present	Succeeded by None
Preceded by Jerry Nelson	Performer of Mr. Johnson; 2016–present	Succeeded by None
Preceded by Steve Whitmire	Performer of Kermit the Frog; 2017–present	Succeeded by none
Preceded by Caroll Spinney	Performer of Big Bird; 1998–present	Succeeded by none
Preceded by None	Performer of Constantine; 2014–present	Succeeded by None
Preceded by Richard Hunt	Forgetful Jones; 2019–present	Succeeded by None
Preceded by Jerry Nelson	Sherlock Hemlock; 2011–present	Succeeded by None
