= Muppets Now =

American comedy series directed by Kirk Thatcher

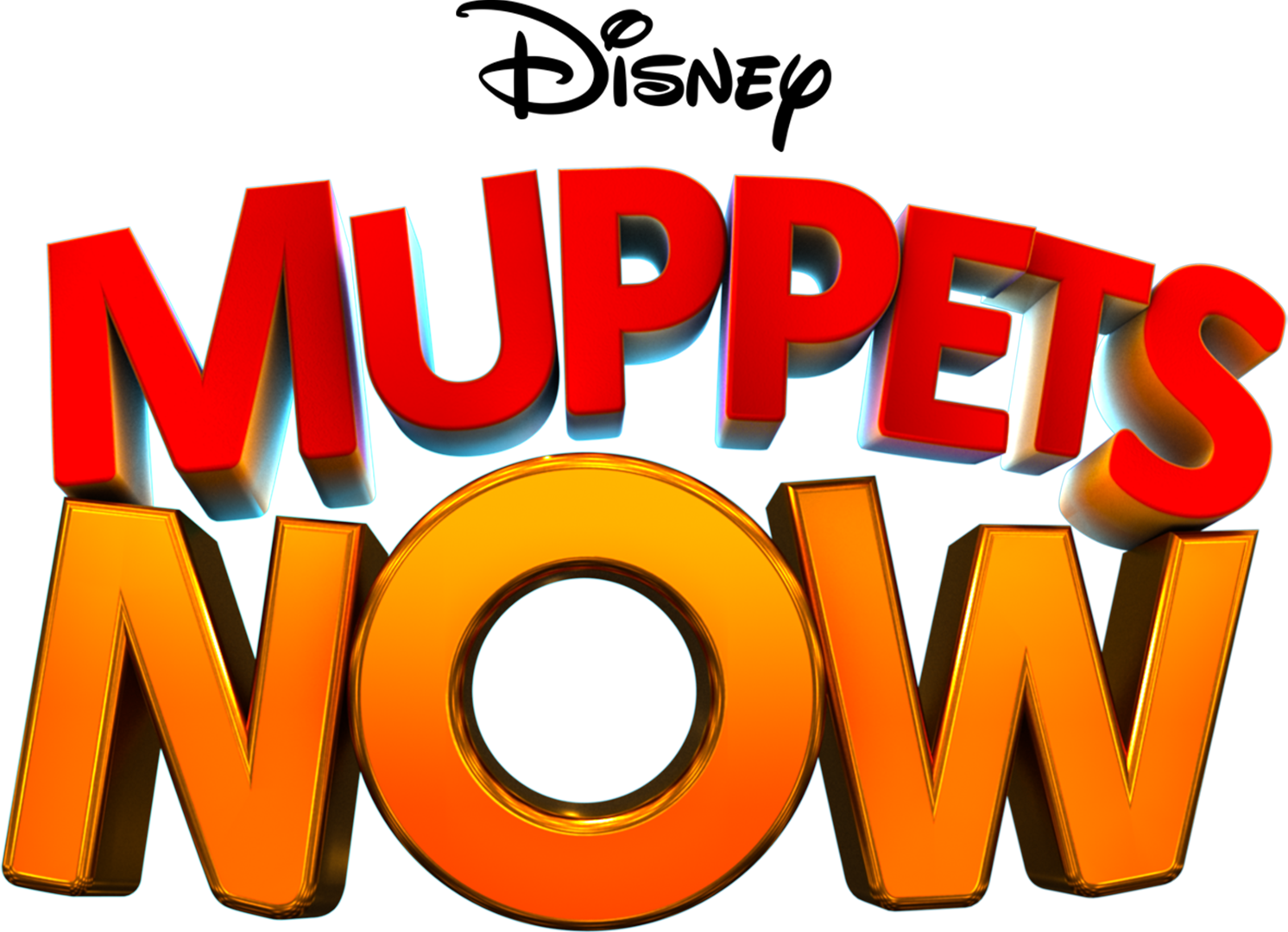
- Genre: Puppetry; Improvisational comedy
- Based on: The Muppet Show by Jim Henson
- Starring: Bill Barretta; Dave Goelz; Eric Jacobson; Peter Linz; David Rudman; Matt Vogel
- Country of origin: United States
- Original language: English
- No. of seasons: 1
- No. of episodes: 6

Production
- Executive producers: Andrew Williams; Bill Barretta; Sabrina Wind
- Running time: 22–24 minutes
- Production companies: Soapbox Films; The Muppets Studio

Original release
- Network: Disney+
- Release: July 31 – September 4, 2020

Related
- Muppet Babies (2018–2022); The Muppets Mayhem (2023)

Muppets Now is an American television miniseries produced by The Muppets Studio for Disney+. Directed by Kirk Thatcher, the series is an improvisational comedy based on The Muppets franchise by Jim Henson. It aired from July 31 to September 4, 2020.

== Premise ==
Muppets Now is a series consisting of multiple different segments bridged together by a framing device featuring Scooter. The segments include a game show, a cooking show, and a talk show. The series was marketed as unscripted, but several writers are credited. The show sees the debut of two new characters, Joe the Legal Weasel and Beverly Plume.

== Segments ==
The segments include:

- Lifesty(le) with Miss Piggy – Miss Piggy offers lifestyle tips with assistance from Uncle Deadly, Taye Diggs, Linda Cardellini, and various other Muppet and celebrity guests. The segment is divided into smaller segments including "Try it with Taye Diggs" in which Piggy and Taye Diggs try beauty regimes or exotic foods and "Le Chat Room" where Miss Piggy discusses the given topic with Linda Cardellini and two other muppets (usually one of which is a random non-anthropomorphic animal or anthropomorphic inanimate object). It appears in all episodes.
- Økėÿ Døkęÿ Køøkïñ – Hosted by turkey Beverly Plume, the Swedish Chef competes against celebrity chefs. It appears in all episodes except the fifth.
- Muppet Masters – Walter discovers the Muppets' hidden talents. It appears in episodes 1 and 5.
- Mup Close and Personal – A different Muppet each time attempts to have an in-depth conversation with a celebrity guest. It appears in episodes 1, 4, and 6.
- Muppet Labs Field Test – Dr. Bunsen Honeydew and Beaker take their experiments out into the open. These are preceded by safety warnings with Kermit and Joe the Legal Weasel. Parts of the segments feature animated muppets as famous historical figures. It appears in all episodes except the first.
- Pepe's Unbelievable Game Show – Scooter has come up with a long list of rules for Pepe the King Prawn's game show, but Pepe himself would rather just make it up as he goes along, to Scooter's annoyance. It appears in episodes 2, 3 and 5.

== Cast ==
=== Muppet performers ===
- Matt Vogel as
  - Kermit the Frog, the leader of the Muppets and Miss Piggy's ex.
  - Uncle Deadly, Miss Piggy's long-suffering, over-dramatic, thespian personal assistant.
  - Camilla the Chicken, Gonzo's chicken girlfriend.
  - Floyd Pepper, the laid back, sarcastic bass guitarist of The Electric Mayhem.
  - Cacti
- Eric Jacobson as
  - Fozzie Bear, Kermit's best friend, a naive, struggling comedian.
  - Miss Piggy, the self-centred host of "Lifestyle with Miss Piggy" and Kermit's ex.
  - Animal, the wild drummer of The Electric Mayhem.
  - Sam Eagle, a patriotic eagle.
  - A Mole who appears in the second installment of "Økėÿ Døkęÿ Køøkïñ".
  - Cacti
- Dave Goelz as
  - The Great Gonzo, an eccentric daredevil and Camilla's boyfriend with unusual interests.
  - Dr. Bunsen Honeydew, a scientist and the host of "Muppet Labs Field Test".
  - Waldorf, an elderly critic.
  - Chip, the I.T. guy.
  - Beauregard, a dim-witted, clumsy janitor of indeterminate species.
  - Zoot, the often-sleepy saxophonist of The Electric Mayhem.
- Bill Barretta as
  - Pepe the King Prawn, a sly and feisty, scheming King Prawn and the host of "Pepe's Unbelievable Game Show" who speaks with a heavy Spanish accent.
  - The Swedish Chef, a nonsensical chef who is the star of "Økėÿ Døkęÿ Køøkïñ" and speaks mock Swedish.
  - Big Mean Carl, a greedy green monster who will eat anything and everything.
  - Howard Tubman, a rich pig and RuPaul superfan who appears in the first episode, interrupting Kermit's interview with his idol.
  - Bubba the Rat, a butch rat and friend of Yolanda.
  - Bobo the Bear, an absent-minded, easy-going bear.
  - Dr. Teeth, the outlandish leader and keyboardist of The Electric Mayhem.
  - Baby
- David Rudman as
  - Scooter, the co-host of "Pepe's Unbelievable Game Show" and the producer of Muppets Now whose job is to upload the show onto Disney+ in time.
  - Beaker, the co-host of "Muppet Labs Field Test" and the victim of Bunsen's experiments.
  - Janice, the chilled-out, offbeat lead guitarist of The Electric Mayhem.
  - Miss Poogy, a member of the Moopets and Miss Piggy's doppelgänger.
  - Baby
- Peter Linz as
  - Walter, the host of "Muppet Masters".
  - Statler, an elderly critic.
  - Link Hogthrob, a wanna-be heartthrob and dim-witted pig.
  - Joe the Legal Weasel, the Muppets' new legal counsel. His main role in the series is in segments preceding "Muppet Labs Field Test", where he and Kermit warn the viewers to not try Bunsen and Beaker's experiments at home.
  - Robin the Frog, Kermit's nephew and the muppets' social media moderator.
  - Beepalyzer, a lonely, outdated computer who appears in the third installment of "Muppet Labs Field Test".
  - Foo-Foo, Miss Piggy's pet dog.
- Julianne Buescher as
  - Yolanda the Rat
  - Beverly Plume, a turkey who is the host of "Økėÿ Døkęÿ Køøkïñ". She also appears in the fifth installment of "Lifestyle with Miss Piggy".
  - Margaret, a Whatnot beautician who appears in "Lifestyle with Miss Piggy".
  - Rosie the Sheep, who appears in "Lifestyle with Miss Piggy".
  - Beak-R, Bunsen's new high tech assistant who appears in the first installment of "Muppet Labs Field Test".
  - Priscilla the Chicken
  - Brie the Cheese
  - Elena the Penguin
  - Some Bunny
  - A Screaming Goat
  - Esther
  - Mary the Cow
- Mike Quinn

=== Additional cast ===
- Piotr Michael as the announcer for "Mup Close and Personal" (voice)
- Matthew Barnette as a Delivery Man
- Cissy Jones
- Carolyn Gardner as the voice of the customer service operator for the "High Pressure Helpline"

==== Contestants on "Pepe's Unbelievable Gameshow" ====
- Brie Carter
- Artoun Nazerith
- Daniel Montgomery
- Niko Posey
- Edward Mawere
- Karina Yzobel

=== Guest stars ===
- Taye Diggs
- Linda Cardellini
- RuPaul
- Carlina Will
- Danny Trejo
- Roy Choi
- Al Madrigal
- Aubrey Plaza
- Marina Michelson
- Seth Rogen

== Production ==
=== Development ===
On August 23, 2019, Disney announced a short-form unscripted series starring The Muppets titled Muppets Now. On December 22, 2019, director Kirk Thatcher said that the series will approach "three different types of shows". The series was originally filmed as several shorts, meant to be released individually but they were put together into 6 episodes with framing material featuring Scooter.

=== Filming ===
Production on Muppets Now began on June 8, 2019, and lasted approximately six days. Thatcher serves as director for the series.

== Episodes ==
| No. | Title | Directed by | Written by | Original release date |
|---|---|---|---|---|
| 1 | "Due Date" | Christopher Alender, Rufus Scot Church & Vito Massaro | Matthew Barnette, Marcos Gabriel, Jim Lewis, Jamilyn Rosalas, Noah Smith, Joanna Truman, Andrew Williams & Kelly Younger | July 31, 2020 |
Scooter uploads the videos for the Muppets' newest show on a tight deadline while receiving messages from his co-workers.: "Lifestyle with Miss Piggy"- Miss Piggy discusses personal style with Uncle Deadly, Taye Diggs, Janice, Rosie the Sheep, and Linda Cardellini.; "Muppet Masters"- Walter discovers Kermit's hidden talent for photobombing.; "Økėÿ Døkęÿ Køøkïñ"- The Swedish Chef and Carlina Will compete against each other to make the best curry.; "Mup Close and Personal"- Kermit attempts to interview RuPaul but is constantly interrupted by the other Muppets.; Guest stars: Linda Cardellini, Taye Diggs, RuPaul, and Carlina Will
| 2 | "Fever Pitch" | Rufus Scot Church & Vito Massaro | Matthew Barnette, Marcos Gabriel, Jim Lewis, Jamilyn Rosalas, Noah Smith, Joanna Truman, Andrew Williams & Kelly Younger | August 7, 2020 |
Scooter has to deal with Fozzie bombarding him with pitches while trying to get the segments up online in time.: "Pepe's Unbelievable Game Show"- Pepe drives Scooter crazy with his made-up rules in this first installment, with help from Beauregard, Carol, and Gonzo and his chickens.; "Økėÿ Døkęÿ Køøkïñ"- The Swedish Chef competes against Danny Trejo to make the best taco.; Muppet Labs Field Tests-Dr. Bunsen Honeydew experiments with melting and burning with his new high-tech assistant Beak-R and a jealous Beaker.; Lifestyle with Miss Piggy-Miss Piggy discusses health with Uncle Deadly, Taye Diggs, Bobo the Bear, Yolanda Rat, Bubba the Rat, Camilla the Chicken, and Linda Cardellini.; Guest stars: Linda Cardellini, Taye Diggs, and Danny Trejo
| 3 | "Getting Testy" | Rufus Scot Church & Vito Massaro | Matthew Barnette, Marcos Gabriel, Jim Lewis, Jamilyn Rosalas, Noah Smith, Joanna Truman, Andrew Williams & Kelly Younger | August 14, 2020 |
Scooter is forced by Joe to host a test-screening for the segments, and the test audience turns out to be Statler and Waldorf.: "Økėÿ Døkęÿ Køøkïñ"- The Swedish Chef helps Roy Choi cook a Kalbi rice bowl with kimchi.; "Muppet Labs Field Tests"-Dr. Bunsen Honeydew and Beaker have some experiments on velocity with the assistance of a pizza delivery man.; "Lifestyle with Miss Piggy"- Miss Piggy discusses relationships with Uncle Deadly, Taye Diggs, Kermit, Beaker, Brie the Cheese, and Linda Cardellini.; "Pepe's Unbelievable Game Show"-Pepe continues to be unpredictable with Miss Piggy and Big Mean Carl's help.; Guest stars: Linda Cardellini, Taye Diggs, Roy Choi, and Al Madrigal
| 4 | "Sleep Mode" | Rufus Scot Church & Vito Massaro | Matthew Barnette, Marcos Gabriel, Jim Lewis, Jamilyn Rosalas, Noah Smith, Joanna Truman, Andrew Williams & Kelly Younger | August 21, 2020 |
Scooter gets Animal's help to keep him awake to upload the videos after he pulled an all-nighter.: "Mup Close and Personal"- Miss Piggy is trying to interview Aubrey Plaza, but gets too distracted by her looks, forcing Uncle Deadly to step in and double for her.; "Muppet Labs Field Tests"- Dr. Bunsen Honeydew, Beaker, and their old and lonely computer, the Beepalyzer, experiment with sound vibrations.; "Økėÿ Døkęÿ Køøkïñ"- The Swedish Chef competes against Giuseppe Losavio to make the best spaghetti.; "Lifestyle with Miss Piggy"- Miss Piggy discusses self care with Uncle Deadly, Taye Diggs, Miss Poogy, Elena, Pepe, and Linda Cardellini.; Guest stars: Linda Cardellini, Taye Diggs, Aubrey Plaza, and Giuseppe Losavio
| 5 | "The I.T. Factor" | Christopher Alender, Rufus Scot Church & Vito Massaro | Matthew Barnette, Marcos Gabriel, Jim Lewis, Jamilyn Rosalas, Noah Smith, Joanna Truman, Andrew Williams & Kelly Younger | August 28, 2020 |
Scooter attempts to overcome the several technical difficulties that come with a system update while uploading the sketches.: "Lifestyle with Miss Piggy"- Miss Piggy discusses travel with Uncle Deadly, Taye Diggs, the Swedish Chef, Foo-Foo, Beverly Plume, some bunny, and Linda Cardellini.; "Muppet Masters"- Walter unveils Uncle Deadly's hidden talent for stage combat.; "Pepe's Unbelievable Game Show"- Scooter tries to keep things under control while Pepe enlists the help of a screaming goat, two cacti, and the Swedish Chef.; "Muppet Labs Field Test"-Dr. Bunsen Honeydew and Beaker experiment with pressure.; Guest stars: Linda Cardellini and Taye Diggs
| 6 | "Socialized" | Christopher Alender, Rufus Scot Church & Vito Massaro | Matthew Barnette, Marcos Gabriel, Jim Lewis, Jamilyn Rosalas, Noah Smith, Joanna Truman, Andrew Williams & Kelly Younger | September 4, 2020 |
Robin makes Scooter co-moderator on the Muppets social media accounts, forcing him to deal with multiple notifications while uploading the videos.: "Muppet Labs Field Test"- Dr. Bunsen Honeydew and Beaker experiment with chemical reactions as Joe makes sure they meet legal standards.; "Økėÿ Døkęÿ Køøkïñ"- The Swedish Chef and Marina Michelson present their unique takes on meatballs.; "Mup Close and Personal"- Fozzie tries to interview Seth Rogen while babysitting a pair of mischievous babies.; "Lifestyle with Miss Piggy"- Miss Piggy discusses treating yourself with Uncle Deadly, Taye Diggs, Walter, Esther, Mary the cow, and Linda Cardellini; Guest stars: Linda Cardellini, Taye Diggs, Marina Michelson, and Seth Rogen

== Release ==
Muppets Now premiered on July 31, 2020, on Disney+ and consisted of six episodes.

=== Marketing ===
On August 23, 2019, during the series' official announcement, a promotional teaser featuring Kermit the Frog and a Muppet named Joe the Legal Weasel was shown at the D23 Expo. On January 1, 2020, footage of the series was released in a video featuring original Disney+ content set to be released through the year. The official trailer was released on June 24, 2020.

== Reception ==
On the review aggregation website Rotten Tomatoes, the series has an approval rating of 70% based on 50 reviews, with an average rating of 6.60/10. The critical consensus reads, "Though Muppets Now's formulaic sketches fail to showcase The Muppets' chaotic charms, it's entertaining enough to suggest that with looser reins - and a lot more music - it could become the best reboot in years." On Metacritic, the series has a weighted average score of 68 out of 100, based on 27 critics, indicating "generally favorable reviews".

Daniel Fienberg of The Hollywood Reporter found that Muppets Now manages to provide a humor that aims an all-age audience, and claimed that the series succeeds to capture the state of disorder that makes the Muppets prosper through its different segments. Judy Berman of Time claimed that the series provides a very effective humor through its segments, while stating that despite not being enthusiastic and sophisticated like The Muppet Show, Muppets Now stays a soothing series that succeeded at keeping the Muppets characters suitable through time. Lucy Mangan of The Guardian rated Muppets Now 4 out of 5 stars, found the series to be the best work from The Muppets franchise since The Muppet Show, and praised the humor of the different segments. Polly Conway of Common Sense Media rated the series 4 out of 5 stars, stating: "Muppets Now is a family-friendly show about the Muppets trying to put together their own streaming series. Made up of different segments -- like Lifesty (sorry, Lifestyle) with Miss Piggy, a cooking show with the Swedish Chef, and many more -- the show features the Muppet crew getting up to their usual hijinks, with a modern twist. Like much Muppet fare, it's slightly edgy, with some very mild innuendo (a Muppet fan tells RuPaul he "just wants to touch him") and cartoonish violence in the form of slapstick and pratfalls. The series is fast-paced, light, and fun; families who are Muppet fans will be pleased to see this return to form from their favorite gang of now media-savvy puppet friends." Kristen Lopez of IndieWire gave the series a C+ rating, found the different segments of the series to be very entertaining, and complimented the chemistry between the Muppets and the guests, but stated that the series does not use the Muppets at their full potential.
