= Richard Hunt (puppeteer) =

American puppeteer (1951–1992)

- Born: August 17, 1951; The Bronx, New York, U.S.
- Died: January 7, 1992 (aged 40); Manhattan, New York, U.S.
- Cause of death: AIDS
- Occupations: Puppeteer, actor
- Years active: 1969–1992
- Notable work: The Muppets; Sesame Street; Fraggle Rock
- Partner: Nelson Bird

Richard Hunt (August 17, 1951 – January 7, 1992) was an American actor and puppeteer, best known as a Muppet performer on Sesame Street, The Muppet Show, Fraggle Rock, and other projects for The Jim Henson Company. His roles on The Muppet Show included Scooter, Statler, Janice, Beaker, and Sweetums and characters on Sesame Street included Gladys the Cow, Don Music, Forgetful Jones and the right head of the Two-Headed Monster.

== Early life ==
Hunt was born in The Bronx, New York. The family eventually moved to Closter, New Jersey some years later.

Hunt came from a family of performers. As a student in middle school and high school, he put on puppet shows for local children, and was a fan of the then-fledgling Muppets. After high school graduation, and a four-month stint of doing weather reports at a local radio station, Hunt pursued a meeting with Jim Henson. He cold-called from a payphone and was invited to audition.

He worked for the Cousin Brucie radio show after graduating from Northern Valley Regional High School at Demarest, faking his credentials to write weather reports.

== Career ==
After he was hired to work on Sesame Street, Hunt mostly performed background characters. One of his first major performances was as Taminella Grinderfall in The Frog Prince, physically performing the character while Jerry Juhl portrayed the voice. Hunt performed Scooter and shared Miss Piggy with Frank Oz until the final quarter of the first season of The Muppet Show.

His characters on Sesame Street included Forgetful Jones, Placido Flamingo, Don Music, Gladys the Cow, and Sully; Hunt also briefly performed Elmo before Kevin Clash was cast in that role. On Fraggle Rock, Hunt's main role was the performing the facial expressions and voice of Junior Gorg; he also performed Gunge (one of the Trash Heap's barkers) as well as several one-shot or minor characters.

Hunt also worked as a director of several home video releases such as Sing-Along, Dance-Along, Do-Along and Elmo's Sing-Along Guessing Game, as well as an episode of Fraggle Rock. Hunt was close friends with fellow puppeteer Jerry Nelson. Several of their characters were paired, such as Nelson's Floyd Pepper with Hunt's Janice; the Two-Headed Monster; and Nelson's Pa Gorg to Hunt's Junior Gorg on Fraggle Rock.

== Personal life ==
Hunt was gay. When Rudolf Nureyev, also openly gay, made a guest appearance on The Muppet Show, Nureyev flirted with Hunt backstage. Hunt was in a relationship with Kenneth "Nelson" Bird, a painter from Alabama, until Bird's death from AIDS in 1985, aged 31.

Mark Hamill told the Milwaukee Journal Sentinel during an interview in November 2003 that he became friends with Hunt during his Muppet Show appearance, and that "[Hunt] became one of the best friends my family has ever had."

== Death and legacy ==
On January 7, 1992, Hunt died of AIDS-related complications at Cabrini Hospice in Manhattan, aged 40. He is one of many commemorated by the NAMES Project AIDS Memorial Quilt. He was cremated and some of his ashes were sprinkled over the flower beds at his family's residence in Closter, New Jersey. His memorial service was held at the Cathedral of St. John the Divine on February 2, 1992. The Muppet Christmas Carol was dedicated in memory of him.

Following Hunt's death, the roles of Scooter and Janice were reassigned to David Rudman in 2008. The roles of Beaker and Statler, likewise, were reassigned to Steve Whitmire and Jerry Nelson, respectively, with Whitmire performing Statler full-time later in 2002. As of 2017, Beaker is now performed by Rudman, and Statler by Peter Linz. John Henson was cast as Sweetums shortly prior to Hunt's death, having initially been trained by Hunt for physical performances in the attraction Muppet*Vision 3D, before Matt Vogel was cast in the role in 2009.

On Sesame Street, Hunt's roles of Sully, Sonny Friendly, and the right head of the Two-Headed Monster were also reassigned to Rudman until the former two were eventually retired, while the role of Gladys the Cow is now performed by Jennifer Barnhart. The role of Don Music has been performed by Ryan Dillon since 2019.

For the 2022 series Fraggle Rock: Back to the Rock, Hunt's characters Junior Gorg, Gunge, and Turbo Doozer were taken over by Dan Garza, John Tartaglia, and Ali J. Eisner, respectively.

Hunt's biography, Funny Boy, written by Jessica Max Stein, was published by Rutgers University Press in March 2024.

== Filmography ==
Film roles
| Year | Film | Role | Notes |
|---|---|---|---|
| 1977 | Emmet Otter's Jug-Band Christmas | Charlie Muskrat, Fred Lizard, George Rabbit | Puppeteer/voice |
| 1979 | The Muppet Movie | Scooter, Janice, Statler, Beaker, Sweetums, Additional Muppets | Puppeteer/voice |
| 1981 | The Great Muppet Caper | Scooter, Janice, Statler, Beaker, Sweetums, Additional Muppets | Puppeeter/voice |
| 1983 | Trading Places | Wilson | |
| 1984 | The Muppets Take Manhattan | Scooter, Janice, Statler, Beaker, Additional Muppets | Puppeteer/voice |
| 1984 | Oxford Blues | Larry | |
| 1985 | Sesame Street Presents: Follow That Bird | Gladys the Cow, Elmo, Board of Birds Member, Sully, Count von Count (puppeteer only) | Puppeteer/voice |
| 1986 | The Christmas Toy | Belmont | Puppeteer/voice |
| 1987 | A Muppet Family Christmas | Scooter, Janice, Statler, Beaker, Gladys the Cow, Additional Muppets | Puppeteer/voice |
| 1990 | The Muppets at Walt Disney World | Scooter, Janice, Beaker, Statler, Additional Muppets | Puppeteer/voice |
| 1990 | The Muppets Celebrate Jim Henson | Scooter, Beaker, Janice | Puppeteer/voice |
| 1991 | Muppet*Vision 3D | Scooter, Statler, Beaker, Sweetums, Additional Muppets | Puppeteer/voice; Theme park attraction |
| 1993 | Billy Bunny's Animal Songs | Edgar Bear, Raccoon | Puppeteer/voice; Posthumous release |

Television roles
| Years | Title | Role | Notes |
|---|---|---|---|
| 1972–1992 | Sesame Street | Placido Flamingo, Don Music, Sully, Gladys the Cow, Two-Headed Monster, Forgetful Jones, Sonny Friendly, Additional Muppets | Puppeteer/voice (Also direct 1 episode) |
| 1976–1981 | The Muppet Show | Scooter, Janice, Statler, Beaker, Sweetums, Additional Muppets | Puppeteer/voice |
| 1983–1987 | Fraggle Rock | Gunge, Junior Gorg, Beige Fraggle, Firechief Fraggle, Flex Doozer, Turbo Doozer, Gillis Fraggle, Lambo, Herkimer Fraggle, Mean Genie, Mudwell the Mudbunny, The Odd Old Man, The Wizard, The Bandit Fraggle, Additional Muppets | Puppeteer/voice (Also direct 1 episode) |
| 1985 | Little Muppet Monsters | Tug Monster, Scooter, Janice, Beaker, Animated Muppet Shorts Narrator | Puppeteer/voice |
| 1990 | The Cosby Show | Statler, Disagreeable Sandwich, Boppity | Puppeteer/voice |

| Preceded by None | Performer of Scooter; 1976–1991 | Succeeded by David Rudman |
| Preceded by Eren Ozker | Performer of Janice; 1977–1991 | Succeeded by David Rudman |
| Preceded by Jim Henson | Performer of Captain Vegetable; 1983–1984 | Succeeded by Peter Linz |
| Preceded by None | Performer of Bobby Benson; 1977–1981 | Succeeded by David Rudman |
| Preceded by None | Performer of Wayne; 1976–1981 | Succeeded by David Rudman |
| Preceded by None | Performer of Gladys the Cow; 1973–1992 | Succeeded by Jennifer Barnhart |
| Preceded by None | Performer of Tug Monster; 1985 | Succeeded by Kevin Clash |
| Preceded by None | Performer of Storyteller Fraggle; 1983 | Succeeded by Terry Angus |
| Preceded by None | Performer of Two-Headed Monster (left head); 1978 | Succeeded by Jerry Nelson |
| Preceded by Peter Friedman | Performer of Two-Headed Monster (right head); 1978–1991 | Succeeded by Adam Hunt |
| Preceded by None | Performer of Sonny Friendly; 1986–1992 | Succeeded by David Rudman |
| Preceded by None | Performer of Sully; 1974–1991 | Succeeded by David Rudman |
| Preceded by Carl Banas (voice)/Jerry Nelson (puppetry) | Performer of Sweetums; 1975–1991 | Succeeded by John Henson |
| Preceded by None | Performer of Beaker; 1977–1991 | Succeeded by Steve Whitmire |
| Preceded by None | Performer of Statler; 1976–1991 | Succeeded by Jerry Nelson |
| Preceded by Michael Earl Davis | Performer of Forgetful Jones; 1981–1991 | Succeeded by Matt Vogel |
| Preceded by Brian Muehl | Elmo; 1984–1985 | Succeeded by Kevin Clash |
| Preceded by None | Don Music; 1974–1991 | Succeeded by Ryan Dillon |
| Preceded by None | Junior Gorg; 1983–1987 | Succeeded by Dan Garza |
| Preceded by None | Gunge; 1983–1987 | Succeeded by John Tartaglia |
| Preceded by None | Turbo Doozer; 1984 | Succeeded by Ali J. Eisner |
