= Don Sahlin =

American muppet designer

- Born: Donald George Sahlin; June 19, 1928; Stratford, Connecticut
- Died: February 19, 1978 (aged 49); New York City, New York
- Occupation: Puppet designer
- Notable work: The Muppets

Donald George Sahlin /səˈliːn/ (June 19, 1928 – February 19, 1978) was a Muppet designer and builder who worked for Jim Henson from 1962 to 1977. Sahlin died in New York, possibly from a heart attack. Muppets creator Jim Henson described Sahlin as "the man most responsible for the look of the Muppets."

== Career ==
Sahlin began making puppets at age 11, initially building a shadow theater and cardboard figurines. As an adult he built several puppets for Kukla, Fran and Ollie and created special effects sequences for films such as G.I. Blues and The Time Machine.

His first creation for Jim Henson was Rowlf the Dog, which he built in 1962 for a series of Purina Dog Chow commercials. Sahlin would go on to design and build most of the Muppet characters, including Bert and Ernie, Grover, and Cookie Monster among others. His character designs are often recognizable for their spheroid heads partially bisected to create large mouths. Sahlin was also involved in special effects production for the Muppets. Henson later had a bench in London dedicated to his memory. The series finale of Fraggle Rock is also dedicated to him. After all the regular credits have been shown, a special credit appears which reads "This show is for Don Sahlin".
