= Jerry Juhl =

American puppeteer and screenwriter (1938–2005)

- Born: Jerome Ravn Juhl; June 28, 1938; Saint Paul, Minnesota, U.S.
- Died: September 25, 2005 (aged 67); San Francisco, California, U.S.
- Resting place: San Francisco Columbarium & Funeral Home
- Education: San Jose State University
- Known for: writing and puppeteering for The Muppets

Jerome Ravn Juhl (June 28, 1938 – September 25, 2005) was an American television and film writer, best known for his work with The Muppets.

== Biography ==
Juhl was born in Saint Paul, Minnesota; his family moved to Menlo Park, California, when he was 14. He received a bachelor's degree in theater arts from San Jose State University in 1961 and worked on children's shows for local television stations while in college. He met Frank Oz when they both worked for the Oakland Recreation Department's Vagabond Puppet Theater as teenagers. The two later met Henson at a puppeteer gathering in California.

Juhl was recruited by Jim Henson as a puppeteer and writer on Sam and Friends. He focused increasingly on writing as other puppeteers, such as Frank Oz, joined the Henson stable.

Juhl was the head writer on The Muppet Show from seasons 2 to 5 (season 1 had Jack Burns as head writer). He also wrote for the television shows Fraggle Rock and The Jim Henson Hour. He was involved in some capacity with all of the Muppet films from The Muppet Movie in 1979 to Muppets from Space in 1999. According to Lisa Henson, "So much of the humor, irreverence, caring and heart began with Jerry. He was, in many ways, the real voice of the Muppets."

He appeared as himself in the 1981 documentary Of Muppets and Men: The Making of The Muppet Show, the 1984 documentary Henson's Place, and the 1994 documentary The World of Jim Henson. In addition to being interviewed in all three, he also appeared in archival footage in the last two.

He was married to Susan Doerr Juhl and lived in Caspar, California. In his last few years he semi-retired from writing, but taught at local colleges, coached at local Mendocino Coast theatres such as Gloriana Opera Company, and spoke at puppeteer conventions. He died on September 25, 2005, from pancreatic cancer at the age of 67. (Note: Juhl's obituary submitted to The New York Times erroneously reported his death as September 27.)

== Awards ==
Juhl co-wrote The Muppet Movie with Jack Burns, for which the two shared a Saturn Award nomination for Best Writing. He was nominated for a shared Emmy four times, for his writing on The Muppet Show, finally winning the award in 1981 for Outstanding Writing in a Variety, Music or Comedy Program. He was also awarded for his work on The Jim Henson Hour (Outstanding Children's Program, 1989, 1990) and The Muppets Celebrate Jim Henson (Outstanding Writing in a Variety or Music Program, 1991). His work on A Muppet Family Christmas won him the WGA Award for Variety – Musical, Award, Tribute, Special Event.

== Filmography ==
Year	Title	Role	Notes
1955–1961	Sam and Friends	Muppet performer	
1969	The Cube		
1969–1975	Sesame Street		
1970	The Great Santa Claus Switch		
1971	The Frog Prince	Taminella	Voice
1972	The Muppet Musicians of Bremen		
1974	The Muppets Valentine Show		
1974	Tale of Sand		Co-writer; Originally written as a live-action screenplay, released in 2012 as a graphic novel, Jim Henson's Tale of Sand.
1976–1981	The Muppet Show		Head writer
1977	Emmet Otter's Jug-Band Christmas		
1979	The Muppets Go Hollywood		
1979	The Muppet Movie		
1981	The Muppets Go to the Movies		
1981	The Great Muppet Caper		
1983–1987	Fraggle Rock		Writer, creative producer
1985	Gonzo Presents Muppet Weird Stuff		
1985	Fozzie's Muppet Scrapbook		
1986	The Muppets: A Celebration of 30 Years		
1987	A Muppet Family Christmas		
1989	The Jim Henson Hour		Writer, co-producer
1989	Living with Dinosaurs		Co-producer
1990	The Muppets at Walt Disney World		
1990	The Muppets Celebrate Jim Henson		
1992	The Muppet Christmas Carol		Co-producer
1996	Muppet Treasure Island		
1999	Muppets from Space		
