= Muppets: The Green Album =

The Muppets: The Green Album

Compilation album by Various artists
- Released: August 23, 2011
- Studio: Various
- Genres: Alternative rock; pop rock; indie rock; power pop; soft rock
- Length: 36:40
- Label: Walt Disney
- Producer: Dani Markman

The Muppets chronology
A Muppets Christmas: Letters to Santa (2008)	The Muppets: The Green Album (2011)	The Muppets: Original Soundtrack (2011)

Singles from Muppets: The Green Album
- 1. "Muppet Show Theme Song" Released: August 19, 2011

The Muppets: The Green Album is a cover album of twelve songs originally recorded by the Muppets, covered by alternative rock and pop artists. The album was released by Walt Disney Records on August 23, 2011, on a digipak CD and as a digital download. A music video was also produced for the album's sole single; "Muppet Show Theme Song", featuring OK Go attempting to produce their own music video until they are interrupted by the Muppets' antics.

Walt Disney Records announced the album at the 2009 D23 Expo as Muppets Revisited with a projected 2010 release date. The original project's name paralleled the title of Nightmare Revisited, the cover album that Disney had released for The Nightmare Before Christmas in 2008. The album was part of Disney's dualistic effort to revitalize the franchise and to promote the subsequent release of the seventh Muppet film, three months later. The album's name is derived as a parody of the Beatles' White Album and the artwork features a "typographic portrait" of Kermit the Frog's face, which is reminiscent of cover art derived from the rock albums of the 1960s.

The Muppets: The Green Album was generally well received by critics and debuted at number 1 on both Billboard's Rock Albums and Alternative Albums charts. With an estimated 30,000 copies initially sold, the album also peaked at number 8 on the Billboard 200 chart, becoming the first Muppet album to enter the top 10.

== Release and promotion ==
Walt Disney Records made the entire album available for preview through NPR's First Listen program a week before release.

The music video for "Muppet Show Theme Song" was released online and for purchase on August 19, 2011. On August 31, OK Go and Animal had a live performance on The Tonight Show with Jay Leno.

To commemorate the Muppets' 70th anniversary, The Green Album was released for the first time on green vinyl LP on May 7, 2025.

=== Release history ===
Release history and formats for The Muppets: The Green Album
Region	Date	Format(s)	Label(s)	Ref.
Various	August 23, 2011	CD; Digital download; streaming	Walt Disney	
Various	May 7, 2025	LP	Walt Disney	

== Music video ==
The members of OK Go are preparing to sing "The Muppet Show Theme" (titled as "Muppet Show Theme Song" on the album), with the help of an elaborate machine, which is inadvertently destroyed by Sweetums. The band is then shown through recreations of their own music videos and homages of traditional Muppet Show sketches, while being accompanied by The Muppets. Statler and Waldorf, are shown at one point briefly watching the video from a computer, but are not satisfied with the Muppets' performances as usual and decide to watch cat videos instead. The video concludes/ends with a series of pseudo-fictional dream sequences, such as Damian Kulash waking up in terror while sleeping with Animal, Dr. Teeth, and Floyd Pepper, Dr. Teeth himself, waking up alongside the OK Go members, and Tim Nordwind finding himself next to Rowlf the Dog, Foo-Foo, a sheep and Kulash's dog, Bunny. The video alludes to former OK Go music videos, including; "Here It Goes Again", "This Too Shall Pass", "All Is Not Lost" and "White Knuckles".

The video has been broadcast on the Disney Channel, Disney XD and Radio Disney. It won the People's Voice Webby Award for the "Viral Video" category at the 16th Annual Webby Awards.

Muppet performers

- Steve Whitmire – Kermit the Frog, Rizzo the Rat, Beaker, Statler, The Muppet Newsman, Bean Bunny, Link Hogthrob, Foo-Foo
- Eric Jacobson – Miss Piggy, Fozzie Bear, Animal, Sam Eagle, Marvin Suggs
- Dave Goelz – The Great Gonzo, Bunsen Honeydew, Waldorf, Zoot, Beauregard, Purple Frackle
- Bill Barretta – Rowlf the Dog, Dr. Teeth, Pepe the King Prawn, Swedish Chef, Bobo the Bear, Mahna Mahna
- David Rudman – Scooter, Janice, Nigel, Beautiful Day Monster, Penguin
- Matt Vogel – Sweetums, Camilla the Chicken, Floyd Pepper, Crazy Harry, Uncle Deadly, Pops, Dr. Julius Strangepork, Lew Zealand, Angel Marie

== Reception ==
Professional ratings
Aggregate scores
Source	Rating
Metacritic	60/100
Review scores
Source	Rating
AllMusic	3/5 stars
Alternative Press	3.5/5 stars
Artistdirect	3/5 stars
Cinema Blend	4.5/5 stars
Consequence of Sound	3/5 stars
IGN	(8/10)
Spin	(7/10)
Sputnikmusic	(2.5/5)
Toronto Star	3.5/4 stars

The Muppets: The Green Album received mixed to positive reviews from music critics. At Metacritic, which assigns a normalized rating out of 100 to reviews from mainstream critics, the album received an average score of 60, based on 8 reviews, indicating "mixed or average reviews".

Chrysta Cherrie of AllMusic concluded her review by stating that, "Muppets: The Green Album freshens up the franchise for the newish millennium, and Generation Z listeners will enjoy hearing current artists in this different context, but other listeners may be left reaching for their classic Muppets fare." A Sputnikmusic reviewer said that "too few of the artists approach the material with the right ideas". Jeremy Frye wrote that the album's potency largely depended on the nostalgia factor; "If you were to see The Green Album sitting on the counter at Starbucks and consider making an impulse buy because you love The Muppets, I’d say go for it. As tributes to significant portions of your childhood go, it could be much worse."

Conversely, Cinema Blend's Joseph Giannone favorably compared the album to The Muppet Show saying that, "Like the original program, The Green Album is an eclectic, smart and eccentric journey through each guest appearance's effort." Consequence of Sound wrote that; "All that's 'green' isn't necessarily gold here, but most of it shines." Elizabeth Keenan of MTV Geek!, commented that, "The album fits well in the grand tradition of the Muppets' connections with real-world pop culture." Alistair McGeorge described the album in her Female First review as "good for a nostalgic listen, the songs have a surprising amount of strength in this setting, and it's a good collection in its own right." Doug Wortel awarded the album an 8 out of 10, while positively remarking that, "The wonderful thing about The Green Album that sets it apart from those other records, besides the source material, is nearly every performer on this album sounds like they’re having a ball, which is exactly what any Jim Henson fan would want from a record like this."

In regards to the album's roster of artists, Sara Baumberger wrote that the selected songs were paired effectively well. Spin's Mikael Wood praised Andrew Bird's rendition of "Bein' Green" remarking, "Andrew Bird sidesteps the precious self-pity you'd expect from "Bein' Green": His Kermit gets the clever-to-cuddly ratio just right." Web Behrens of Time Out Chicago spoke highly of OK Go's cover; "Layering in everything from electronica to a perfectly quirky "Flight of the Bumblebees" sample, the homegrown band knows just how to push the envelope. We loved it even before we saw the video, which is sure to be another viral hit for Kulash and Company, taking their trippy cover to an even higher level." Peter Chianca of Wicked Local, wrote in regards to Weezer and Hayley Williams' cover; "complete with twittering swamp sounds, approximates the wistfulness that the late Jim Henson brought to the original." Chianca also noted that, "Alkaline Trio's punky take on "Movin' Right Along" is the album's standout, riffing playfully on the Kermit-and-Fozzie banter." John Terauds of the Toronto Star commended the album as a whole, highlighting that, "The finest treats come from two of the gentlest and most memorable melodies brought to us by Kermit the Frog: "Rainbow Connection", where Hayley Williams of Paramore sweetly recaptures the original's innocent wonder and longing, boosted by Weezer's pastel-swampy backdrop; and Andrew Bird's clean, frank delivery of "Bein' Green"."

== Track listing ==
No.	Title	Writer(s)	Artist	Length
1.	"Muppet Show Theme Song"	Sam Pottle, Jim Henson	OK Go	2:36
2.	"Rainbow Connection"	Paul Williams, Kenneth Ascher	Weezer & Hayley Williams	4:00
3.	"Mahna Mahna"	Piero Umiliani	The Fray	2:13
4.	"Movin' Right Along"	Williams, Ascher	Alkaline Trio	2:33
5.	"Our World"	Williams	My Morning Jacket	3:05
6.	"Halfway Down the Stairs"	Harold Fraser-Simon, A. A. Milne	Amy Lee	2:25
7.	"Mr. Bassman"	Johnny Cymbal	Sondre Lerche	2:41
8.	"Wishing Song"	Paul Tracey	The Airborne Toxic Event	2:47
9.	"Night Life"	Joseph Raposo	Brandon Saller (Of Atreyu) & Billy Martin	2:59
10.	"Bein' Green"	Raposo	Andrew Bird	4:10
11.	"I Hope That Somethin' Better Comes Along"	Williams, Ascher	Matt Nathanson	2:42
12.	"I'm Going to Go Back There Someday"	Williams, Ascher	Rachael Yamagata	4:15
Total length:				36:40

Australia/New Zealand Bonus Tracks
No.	Title	Writer(s)	Artist	Length
13.	"Simon Smith and the Amazing Dancing Bear"	Randy Newman	Missy Higgins	1:58
Total length:				38:38

== Personnel ==
"Muppet Show Theme Song"

- OK Go – production
  - Damian Kulash – lead vocals, guitar
  - Tim Nordwind – bass guitar and vocals
  - Dan Konopka – drums, percussion
  - Andy Ross – lead guitar, keyboard, vocals
- Dave Fridmann – mixing

"Rainbow Connection"

- Allison Allport – harp
- Blake Mills – guitar
- Brian Malouf – mixing
- Shawn Everett – recording
- Jake Sinclair – recording

"Mahna Mahna"

- The Fray – production
- Warren Huart – production, engineering and mixing
- Mark Gray – assistant engineer
- Robin Holden – mixing assistant

"Movin' Right Along"

- Matt Skiba - Vocals, Guitar
- Dan Andriano - Vocals, Bass Guitar
- Derek Grant - Drums
- Matt Allison – production, mixing

"Our World"

- Yin Yames – production
- Kevin Ratterman – mixing

"Halfway Down the Stairs"

- Will Hunt – production, programming
- Amy Lee – organ, production
- Daniel Mendez – mixing

"Mr. Bassman"

- Sondre Lerche – lead vocals, guitar, bass
- Kato Ådland – banjo, beatboxing, mixing

"Wishing Song"

- Pete Min – production
- Mikel Jollett – production

"Night Life"

- Ryan Williams – production, mixing
- Brandon Saller – drums, vocals, keyboards, additional bass
- Billy Martin – guitar, bass, additional vocals
- Ashley Saller – additional vocals
- Lindsey Martin – additional vocals
- Dravyn Martin – additional vocals

"Bein' Green"

- Andrew Bird – violin, vocals, guitar, production
- Kevin O'Donnell – drums
- Chris Scruggs – bass, lap steel guitar
- William Tyler – guitar
- Mark Nevers – mixing
- Amanda Hassell – assistant

"I Hope That Something Better Comes Along"

- Mark Weinberg – production
- Dan Eisenberg – piano, B3
- Aaron Tap – backing vocals

"I'm Going to Go Back There Someday"

- Mike Viola – tack piano, P bass, acoustic guitar, backing vocals, production
- Paul Ahlstrand – strings, reed
- Ducky Carlise – percussion, mixing
- Tim Mayer – flute, alto flute
- Jerry Vejmola – oboe
- Michael Rosenbloom – violin
- Jean Haig – viola
- Ron Lowry – cello

Album credits

- Dani Markman – executive producer
- Melissa Bolton – business and legal affairs
- Stephen Marcussen – mastering
- Steve Gerdes – creative direction and album design

== Charts ==
Chart (2011)	Peak position
Canadian Albums Chart	14
U.S. Billboard 200	8
U.S. Billboard Alternative Albums	1
U.S. Billboard Digital Albums	5
U.S. Billboard Kids Albums	1
U.S. Billboard Rock Albums	1
U.S. Billboard Tastemakers Albums	11

== See also ==
- Nightmare Revisited
- A Whole New Sound
- The Muppets: Original Soundtrack
- The Muppets: A Green and Red Christmas
