= The Muppets: A Green and Red Christmas =

2006 The Muppets album

Studio album by The Muppets
- Released: October 17, 2006; November 1, 2011 (re-release)
- Recorded: 2006
- Genre: Christmas, comedy
- Length: 36:53 (original release); 42:53 (2011 re-issue)
- Label: Walt Disney
- Producer: Ed Mitchell, Ted Kryczko

The Muppets chronology
Best of the Muppets featuring The Muppets' Wizard of Oz (2005)	The Muppets: A Green and Red Christmas (2006)	A Muppets Christmas: Letters to Santa (2008)

Re-release cover
- 2011 reissue

The Muppets: A Green and Red Christmas is a Christmas album by The Muppets. The album was released by Walt Disney Records on October 17, 2006, on CD and as a digital download in the iTunes Store.

In 2008, the album won a Grammy Award for Best Musical Album for Children.

The album was reissued on November 1, 2011, as part of the marketing promotion for the film The Muppets.

== Track listing ==
The Muppets: A Green and Red Christmas
No.	Title	Artist	Length
1.	"'Zat You, Santa Claus?"	Dr. Teeth and the Electric Mayhem	2:34
2.	"A Red and Green Christmas"	Kermit the Frog and Miss Piggy	3:23
3.	"The Christmas Party Sing-Along"	Rowlf the Dog	3:00
4.	"Merry Christmas Baby"	Pepe the King Prawn	2:45
5.	"The Man with the Bag"	Floyd Pepper, Animal and Zoot	3:08
6.	"Santa Baby"	Miss Piggy	2:51
7.	"It's the Most Wonderful Time of the Year"	Gonzo and Rizzo the Rat	2:52
8.	"North Pole Comedy Club"	Fozzie Bear, Statler and Waldorf	3:42
9.	"Run Rudolph Run"	Dr. Teeth and The Electric Mayhem	3:09
10.	"Christmas Smorgasbord"	The Swedish Chef	3:02
11.	"The Christmas Queen"	Miss Piggy	2:38
12.	"Have Yourself a Merry Little Christmas"	Kermit the Frog	3:49
Total length:			36:53

2011 Re-Release Extra Tracks
No.	Title	Writer(s)	Artist(s)	Length
13.	"I Wish I Could Be Santa Claus"	Paul Williams	Gonzo and Fozzie Bear	2:24
14.	"Jingle Bells"		Andrea Bocelli with The Muppets	3:36
Total length:				42:53

=== Muppet performers ===
- Steve Whitmire as Kermit the Frog, Rizzo the Rat, Statler
- Eric Jacobson as Miss Piggy, Fozzie Bear, Animal
- Dave Goelz as Gonzo, Waldorf, Zoot
- Bill Barretta as Rowlf the Dog, Pepé the King Prawn, Dr. Teeth, Swedish Chef
- John Kennedy as Sgt. Floyd Pepper

Additional performers include: Louise Gold, Jerry Nelson, Karen Prell, Mike Quinn, and David Rudman

Professional ratings
Review scores
Source	Rating
AllMusic	3/5 stars
Artistdirect	3/5 stars

== See also ==
- Kermit Unpigged
- Muppets: The Green Album
- The Muppets: Original Soundtrack
