= The Muppets (soundtrack) =

Original soundtrack for The Muppets (2011)

The Muppets (Original Motion Picture Soundtrack)

Soundtrack album by Various artists
- Released: November 22, 2011
- Recorded: 2011
- Studio: Ocean Way Studios
- Genre: Musical theatre; Popular music; rock
- Length: 40:05
- Label: Walt Disney
- Producer: Kaylin Frank; Mitchell Leib

The Muppets chronology
Muppets: The Green Album (2011)	The Muppets (Original Motion Picture Soundtrack) (2011)	Muppets Most Wanted: Original Soundtrack (2014)

Professional ratings
Review scores
Source	Rating
About.com	3.5/5 stars
AllMusic	4/5 stars

The Muppets: An Original Walt Disney Records Soundtrack is a soundtrack album released by Walt Disney Records on November 22, 2011 for the musical comedy film The Muppets. The soundtrack features five original songs, four re-recordings and remasterings of popular Muppet songs ("The Muppet Show Theme", "Rainbow Connection", and "Mah Nà Mah Nà"), two cover versions of existing songs (Cee Lo Green's "Forget You" and Nirvana's "Smells Like Teen Spirit"), two standalone songs (Paul Simon's "Me and Julio Down by the Schoolyard" and Starship's "We Built This City"), and fifteen dialogue tracks. It also features the song "Man or Muppet", which won the Academy Award for Best Original Song. The soundtrack was also nominated for Best Compilation Soundtrack for Visual Media at the 55th Grammy Awards.

Songs not included in the album, but featured in the film include Gary Numan's "Cars", AC/DC's "Back in Black", George Thorogood's "Bad to the Bone", Jeff Moss' "Together Again" (from The Muppets Take Manhattan) and Bill Medley & Jennifer Warnes' "(I've Had) The Time of My Life".

A Spanish version of the soundtrack was released as Los Muppets: Banda Sonora Original de Walt Disney Records on December 6, 2011. The Spanish version received a nomination for Best Latin Children's Album at the 13th Latin Grammy Awards.

== Track listing ==
No.	Title	Writer(s)	Artist(s)	Length
1.	"The Muppet Show Theme" (featuring Joanna Newsom)	Sam Pottle; Jim Henson	The Muppets	0:51
2.	"Muppet Studios, I Can't Believe It" (Dialogue)		Peter Linz	0:04
3.	"Life's a Happy Song" (featuring Feist and Mickey Rooney)	Bret McKenzie	Jason Segel, Amy Adams and Peter Linz	4:29
4.	"I Haven't Seen the Old Gang" (Dialogue)		Steve Whitmire and Jason Segel	0:20
5.	"Pictures in My Head" (produced by Bret McKenzie)	Jeannie Lurie; Aris Archontis; Chen Neeman	Steve Whitmire and the Muppets	2:36
6.	"We Drive" (Dialogue)		Steve Whitmire and Peter Linz	0:11
7.	"Me and Julio Down by the Schoolyard"	Paul Simon	Simon	2:42
8.	"That Spells Reno" (Dialogue)		Matt Vogel and Amy Adams	0:18
9.	"Rainbow Connection (Moopets Version)"	Paul Williams; Kenneth Ascher	Eric Jacobson and the Moopets	1:02
10.	"Welcome Back" (Dialogue)		Steve Whitmire, Eric Jacobson, Peter Linz, and Bill Barretta	0:20
11.	"We Built This City"	Bernie Taupin; Martin Page; Dennis Lambert; Peter Wolf	Starship	4:54
12.	"Party of One" (Dialogue)		Sarah Silverman and Amy Adams	0:09
13.	"Me Party"	McKenzie; Paul Roemen	Amy Adams and Eric Jacobson	1:53
14.	"We Humbly Ask" (Dialogue)		Steve Whitmire and Chris Cooper	0:09
15.	"Let's Talk About Me" (featuring Nathan Pacheco)	Ali Dee Theodore; McKenzie	Chris Cooper	2:33
16.	"The Answer is No" (Dialogue)		Chris Cooper and Steve Whitmire	0:06
17.	"Are You a Man or a Muppet?" (Dialogue)		Amy Adams	0:08
18.	"Man or Muppet"	McKenzie	Jason Segel and Peter Linz	2:58
19.	"Down at the Ole Barbershop" (Dialogue)		Steve Whitmire	0:07
20.	"Smells Like Teen Spirit"	Kurt Cobain; Dave Grohl; Krist Novoselic	The Muppets Barbershop Quartet (Steve Whitmire, Bill Barretta, and Eric Jacobson)	2:23
21.	"Princesses of Poultry" (Dialogue)		Steve Whitmire	0:06
22.	"Forget You"	Christopher "Brody" Brown; Peter Hernandez; CeeLo Green; Philip Lawrence; Ari Levine	Matt Vogel and the Chickens	2:29
23.	"It's Time for Our Song" (Dialogue)		Steve Whitmire and Eric Jacobson	0:04
24.	"Rainbow Connection"	Williams; Ascher	Steve Whitmire, Eric Jacobson, and the Muppets	3:09
25.	"Get Out There and Help Those Guys" (Dialogue)		Jason Segel	0:06
26.	"The Whistling Caruso"	Andrew Bird	Andrew Bird	1:15
27.	"How Charming, a Finale" (Dialogue)		Matt Vogel	0:06
28.	"Life's a Happy Song (Finale)"	McKenzie	The Muppets, Jason Segel, Amy Adams, and Chris Cooper	2:23
29.	"Mary, Marry Me" (Dialogue)		Jason Segel and Amy Adams	0:09
30.	"Mahna Mahna"	Piero Umiliani; George Shearing; George David Weiss	Jim Henson and Frank Oz	2:05
Total length:				40:05

United States and Australian bonus tracks
No.	Title	Writer(s)	Artist(s)	Length
31.	"Rainbow Connection"	Paul Williams; Kenneth Ascher	Steve Whitmire	3:06
Total length:				43:11

United Kingdom iTunes bonus track
No.	Title	Writer(s)	Artist(s)	Length
31.	"Dance with Me Tonight" (from The X Factor)	Olly Murs; Claude Kelly; Steve Robson	Olly Murs and The Muppets	3:27
Total length:				43:32

== Charts ==
=== Weekly charts ===
Chart (2011–2012)	Peak position
Australian Albums (ARIA)	57
US Billboard 200	38
US Digital Albums (Billboard)	11
US Soundtrack Albums (Billboard)	4

=== Year-end charts ===
Chart (2012)	Position
US Billboard 200	168
US Soundtrack Albums (Billboard)	10

== The Muppets: Original Score ==
The Muppets (Original Score)

Film score by Christophe Beck
- Released: April 15, 2014
- Recorded: 2011
- Studio: Sony Scoring Stage, Culver City, California
- Label: Walt Disney; Intrada
- Producer: Mitchell Leib

An album containing Christophe Beck's scores for The Muppets and Muppets Most Wanted was released by Intrada Records on April 28, 2014. The track listing below represents the album's section for The Muppets (tracks 25-47).

All tracks are written by Christophe Beck.

No.	Title	Length
1.	"To Hollywood"	2:53
2.	"Maniacal Laugh"	1:07
3.	"The Search for the Frog"	1:22
4.	"Moral Support"	0:56
5.	"Getting Gonzo"	0:43
6.	"Rebuffed"	1:22
7.	"Traveling by Map"	0:53
8.	"Man of Muppets"	0:46
9.	"Muppet Man"	0:48
10.	"The Muppet Party"	1:02
11.	"Got the Show"	0:27
12.	"Theatre in Ruins"	1:04
13.	"Piggy vs. Poogy"	0:48
14.	"Under the Stars"	1:55
15.	"Breakneck Driving"	0:41
16.	"Jack Black Attack"	1:33
17.	"The Telethon Takeoff"	0:45
18.	"Tex Reciprocates"	2:19
19.	"The First Call"	0:49
20.	"Scooter Takeover"	1:10
21.	"Photo Reunion"	1:28
22.	"The Last Act"	2:15
23.	"We Fail Together"	3:42

== Personnel ==
Muppet performers

- Steve Whitmire – Kermit the Frog, Beaker, Statler, Rizzo the Rat, Link Hogthrob
- Eric Jacobson – Miss Piggy, Fozzie Bear, Animal, Sam Eagle, Marvin Suggs
- Dave Goelz – Gonzo the Great, Dr. Bunsen Honeydew, Zoot, Beauregard, Waldorf, Kermit Moopet
- Bill Barretta – Rowlf the Dog, The Swedish Chef, Dr. Teeth, Pepé the King Prawn, Bobo the Bear, Muppet Gary
- David Rudman – Scooter, Janice, Miss Poogy, Wayne
- Matt Vogel – Floyd Pepper, Camilla the Chicken, Sweetums, '80s Robot, Lew Zealand, Uncle Deadly, Crazy Harry, Rowlf Moopet
- Peter Linz – Walter
- Jim Henson – Mahna Mahna (archival)
- Frank Oz - Snowths (archival)

Production

- Christophe Beck – composer
- Bret McKenzie – composer, producer, music supervisor
- Kaylin Frank – producer
- Mitchell Leib – producer, executive in charge of music
- James Bobin – executive producer
- David Hoberman – executive producer
- Todd Lieberman – executive producer
- Peter Rotter – orchestra contractor
- Jasper Randall – choir contractor

Orchestration

- Tim Davies – conductor
- Dave Metzger – score orchestration
- Chris Caswell – orchestration
- Zach Robinson – arranger, orchestration
- Doug Walter – orchestration
- Joanne Kane – music preparation
- Booker White – music preparation

Technical

- David Bianco – engineer, vocal engineer
- David Boucher – engineer, vocal engineer
- Mike Klein – engineer
- Brian Malouf – engineer, mixing
- Rick Ruggieri – engineer, mixing
- Casey Stone – engineer, mixing
- Joseph Magee – engineer, mixing supervisor
- Nick Wollage – engineer, vocal engineer
- Ed Mitchell - vocal producer
- Mickey Petralia – mixing
- Patricia Sullivan – mastering
- Richard Ford – score editor
- Brett Pierce – music editor
- Lisa Jaime – supervising music editor

Art

- Steve Gerdes – art direction, design
- Steve Sterling – art direction, design
