= A Muppets Christmas: Letters to Santa =

- DVD cover
- Screenplay by: Hugh Fink; Scott Ganz; Andrew Samson; Paul Williams
- Story by: Paul Williams; Hugh Fink; Scott Ganz; Andrew Samson
- Directed by: Kirk R. Thatcher
- Starring: The Muppets; Uma Thurman; Jane Krakowski; Nathan Lane; Jesse L. Martin; Madison Pettis
- Composer: Chris Caswell
- Country of origin: United States
- Original language: English

Production
- Producers: Anthony Katagas; Martin G. Baker
- Cinematography: Luke Geissbuhler
- Editor: Jamie Kirkpatrick
- Running time: 45 minutes; 56 minutes (Extended Edition)
- Production companies: The Muppets Studio; Walt Disney Studios (Note: Produced with Walt Disney Television, but Walt Disney Studios credited at the end of the movie instead.)

Original release
- Network: NBC
- Release: December 17, 2008

A Muppets Christmas: Letters to Santa is a 2008 American television special directed by Kirk R. Thatcher featuring The Muppets in a Christmas mission to personally deliver three letters to Santa Claus, accidentally diverted by Gonzo, to the North Pole. The special was produced by The Muppets Studio and aired on NBC on December 17, 2008. The special, shot in Brooklyn and Midtown Manhattan, was released by Walt Disney Studios Home Entertainment on DVD in 2009.

== Plot ==
On Christmas Eve in New York City, the Muppets aren't planning to spend Christmas together, because Kermit the Frog and Miss Piggy are heading for the Caribbean for a romantic date, Gonzo the Great is going to Hawaii, and Fozzie Bear is embarking on a comedy road tour. Before they go, however, they go to the post office to deliver each of their letters to Santa Claus with Mayor Michael Bloomberg denying Piggy's offer to move the line along as people in New York should be polite. The Muppets deliver their letters as Gonzo accidentally speeds up the letter conveyor belt as a postal worker (Jesse L. Martin) has the Muppets delivered back to their apartment building. When they head back to their apartment, Gonzo discovers that three letters wound up in his coat from a mishap there. One of those letters he recognizes as being written by his best friend, a neighbor girl named Claire (Madison Pettis).

With the post office closed early and Sam Eagle warning Gonzo and Fozzie about the pitfalls of opening someone else's mail, the Muppets try different attempts like a pigeon delivery service and the enlistment of two Mafia members (Steve Schirripa and Tony Sirico). Finally, after Piggy leaves to the Caribbean herself, Gonzo suggests that Kermit, Fozzie, Rizzo the Rat, and Pepe the King Prawn would come with him to the North Pole and deliver the letters personally. They get there in a taxi while scavenging money to pay the taxicab driver (Whoopi Goldberg). The Muppets end up getting tickets from a North Pole Airlines clerk named Joy (Uma Thurman) and getting caught by a bitter security guard Officer Frank Meany (Nathan Lane) who, for being a bully in his youth, perpetually ended up on Santa's naughty list. It's also because of his appearance that people often fear him. He and Bobo the Bear allow the Muppets to pass through.

They eventually reach the North Pole, only to find out from the Chief Christmas Elf (Paul Williams) that Santa has already left to deliver the presents. The real Santa (Richard Griffiths) overhears their grieving and returns. While on a sleigh ride after being helped by Joy, they hand him Claire's letter and the other two which are revealed to have come from Pepe and Frank. Pepe wanted to become an expert opera singer which Santa grants. Frank wanted to be taken off the naughty list. Santa grants this wish enabling Frank to finally get that red tricycle he wanted as it appears before him and Bobo. Santa brings them home to New York in time to spend the rest of the holiday with Claire and her mom (Jane Krakowski), which was all Claire wanted in the first place. All the Muppets, along with Piggy (who has surprisingly returned from the Caribbean for the party), show up after cancelling their vacations where they celebrate Christmas with Claire and her mom as they decorate her apartment.

== Cast ==
- Madison Pettis - Claire
- Jane Krakowski - Claire's Mom
- Richard Griffiths - Santa Claus
- Nathan Lane - Officer Frank Meany
- Uma Thurman - Joy

=== Muppet performers ===
- Steve Whitmire - Kermit the Frog, Rizzo the Rat (most scenes), Beaker, Statler
- Dave Goelz - Gonzo the Great, Dr. Bunsen Honeydew, Zoot, Waldorf, Beauregard
- Bill Barretta - Pepe the King Prawn, Bobo the Bear, Rowlf the Dog, Swedish Chef, Dr. Teeth (most scenes), Pigeon Dad
- Eric Jacobson - Fozzie Bear, Miss Piggy, Animal, Sam the Eagle
- David Rudman - Scooter, Janice
- Matt Vogel - Floyd Pepper, Camilla the Chicken, Lew Zealand, Crazy Harry, Robin the Frog, Pigeon Son
- Noel MacNeal - Sweetums
- Tyler Bunch - Pigeon Mom, Snail, Rizzo the Rat (one scene)
- Leslie Carrara-Rudolph - Penguin
- Martin P. Robinson - Penguin, Snail, Dr. Teeth (one scene)

Additional Muppets performed by Pam Arciero, Heather Asch, Stephanie D'Abruzzo, James Godwin, Jim Kroupa, Tim Lagasse, Peter Linz, Jim Martin, and Paul McGinnis

=== Cameo guest stars ===
- Mayor Michael Bloomberg - Himself
- Whoopi Goldberg - Cab Driver
- Jesse L. Martin - Postal Worker
- Petra Němcová - Beaker's Girlfriend
- Steve Schirripa - Mafia Guy
- Tony Sirico - Mafia Guy
- Paul Williams - Chief Christmas Elf

== Music ==
A Muppets Christmas: Letters to Santa (Soundtrack from the TV Special)

EP by The Muppets
- Released: November 23, 2009
- Genre: Christmas
- Length: 12:03
- Label: Walt Disney

The Muppets chronology
The Muppets: A Green and Red Christmas (2006)	A Muppets Christmas: Letters to Santa (Soundtrack from the TV Special) (2009)	Muppets: The Green Album (2011)

This is the fourth time that songwriter Paul Williams has contributed songs to the Muppets. A version of "Santa Claus Is Comin' to Town" by The Crystals was also used during the opening credits but was not available on the soundtrack itself.

=== Soundtrack ===
A Muppets Christmas: Letters to Santa (Soundtrack from the TV Special)
No.	Title	Artist	Length
1.	"Delivering Christmas" (featuring Jesse L. Martin)	Kermit the Frog, Miss Piggy, Fozzie Bear, Gonzo, Pepe the King Prawn, Pepe, Sweetums, Camilla the Chicken, and Everyone Else	3:41
2.	"It's All About Heart"	Kermit the Frog, Fozzie Bear, Gonzo, Pepe the King Prawn, Rizzo the Rat	1:43
3.	"I Wish I Could Be Santa Claus"	Gonzo & Fozzie Bear	2:26
4.	"My Best Christmas Yet" (featuring Jane Krakowski and Madison Pettis)	The Muppets	4:13
Total length:			12:03

== See also ==
- List of Christmas films
