= Muppets from Space =

1999 film by Tim Hill

- Theatrical release poster
- Directed by: Tim Hill
- Written by: Jerry Juhl; Joseph Mazzarino; Ken Kaufman
- Produced by: Brian Henson; Martin G. Baker
- Starring: Steve Whitmire; Dave Goelz; Bill Barretta; Frank Oz; Jeffrey Tambor; F. Murray Abraham; David Arquette; Josh Charles; Hulk Hogan; Ray Liotta; Andie MacDowell
- Cinematography: Alan Caso
- Edited by: Michael A. Stevenson; Richard Pearson
- Music by: Jamshied Sharifi
- Production companies: Columbia Pictures; Jim Henson Pictures
- Distributed by: Sony Pictures Releasing
- Release date: July 14, 1999
- Running time: 88 minutes
- Country: United States
- Language: English
- Budget: $24 million
- Box office: $22.3 million

Muppets from Space is a 1999 American science fiction comedy film directed by Tim Hill in his directorial debut and written by Jerry Juhl, Joseph Mazzarino, and Ken Kaufman. It is the sixth theatrical film featuring the Muppets. The film stars Muppet performers Steve Whitmire, Dave Goelz, Jerry Nelson, Bill Barretta, and Frank Oz, as well as Jeffrey Tambor, F. Murray Abraham, David Arquette, Josh Charles, Hollywood Hogan, Ray Liotta, Rob Schneider, and Andie MacDowell. In the film, Gonzo attempts to discover his origins. After he and Rizzo the Rat are captured by government officials during his search, Kermit the Frog and the rest of the Muppets set out to rescue them.

The film was produced by Jim Henson Pictures and released on July 14, 1999 by Sony Pictures Releasing through its Columbia Pictures label. It was a box-office disappointment, grossing $22.3 million against a budget of $24 million, and received mixed reviews from critics.

It is the last Muppet film to involve Oz and Juhl, the last theatrically released Muppet film to be produced by the Jim Henson Company before the franchise was acquired by the Walt Disney Company in 2004, and the last theatrically released film until The Muppets was released on November 23, 2011.

== Plot ==
Gonzo's species has always been a mystery, but after having nightmares of being denied entry to Noah's Ark, he begins to realize just how alone he is in the world. Gonzo tells Kermit that he is getting tired of being referred to as a "whatever". After an alien species appears to be trying to send a message through his bowl of alphabet cereal, Gonzo realizes that he may not be alone after all and that evening, he climbs to the rooftop of the Muppet boarding house to watch the sky. He is struck by a bolt of lightning, which allows him to communicate with a pair of cosmic knowledge fish, who reveal his origins as an alien from outer space.

Hoping to contact the aliens, Gonzo makes an impromptu appearance at the television studio for UFO Mania during a live broadcast, where Miss Piggy is working. Concerned about Gonzo's behavior, Kermit and Rizzo go down to the studio. Unable to convince his friends of the aliens' existence, Gonzo is lured by Agent Barker to K. Edgar Singer of C.O.V.N.E.T., a clandestine national security facility whose mission is to investigate threats of extraterrestrial attacks. Singer is aware of the aliens' attempts to communicate with Earth, and having seen Gonzo on television, believes that he is the key to convincing his superior General Luft that aliens exist.

Gonzo and Rizzo are taken to C.O.V.N.E.T., where Rizzo gets flushed down a tube to the facility's rat medical research held by Dr. Tucker, alongside other Muppet rats. Unable to get answers from Gonzo about the aliens, Singer decides to have Gonzo's brain surgically removed and has him taken to a holding cell while the surgery is prepared. Meanwhile, after Miss Piggy interrogates Barker, she, Kermit, Fozzie, Pepe, and Animal go to rescue Gonzo and Rizzo from C.O.V.N.E.T., using various inventions from Bunsen and Beaker.

While Gonzo is in his cell, an alien channeling his voice through a sandwich asks him where the alien ship can land, and Gonzo suggests a beach named Cape Doom, unaware that Singer's assistant Agent Rentro (Bobo the Bear) is listening. Gonzo is then taken to the surgery room, and the Muppets arrive to rescue him and Rizzo. Meanwhile, Rizzo escapes from medical research and frees Gonzo from the dissection table, while Singer and Luft witness the other rats attack the surgeon Dr. Phil Van Neuter. Feeling that his time has been wasted, Luft angrily leaves. Upon discovering from Rentro that Gonzo is heading for Cape Doom, Singer prepares a weapon called the Subatomic Neutro-Destabilizer to use on the aliens and heads to Cape Doom with Rentro.

The Muppets rescue Gonzo from the facility, then arrive at Cape Doom where a crowd of alien believers await their arrival. After an hour-long wait, the ship arrives and the aliens, who all resemble Gonzo, explain that many years ago they lost him, but now welcome him back. Singer shows up and tries to kill the aliens, ultimately failing to do so (Rentro having removed the weapon's battery), and is laughed at. Gonzo considers going with his long-lost family to their home planet but chooses to stay on Earth with the Muppets with his family's blessing, while a redeemed Singer is invited by the aliens to go with them and leaves as Earth's ambassador.

== Cast ==
- Jeffrey Tambor as K. Edgar "Ed" Singer, the head of C.O.V.N.E.T.
- Pat Hingle as General Luft, a military official whom K. Edgar Singer reports to
- Andie MacDowell as Shelley Snipes, a UFO Mania anchorwoman
- Rob Schneider as the TV producer of UFO Mania
- Gary Owens as UFO Mania Announcer (voice)

=== Muppet performers ===
- Dave Goelz as Gonzo, Bunsen Honeydew, Waldorf, The Birdman, Beauregard and Zoot
- Steve Whitmire as Kermit the Frog, Rizzo the Rat, Beaker, Cosmic Fish #1, Bean Bunny and Alien Gonzo
- Bill Barretta as Pepe the King Prawn, Bobo the Bear as Rentro, Bubba the Rat, Johnny Fiama, Cosmic Fish #2, Rowlf the Dog, Lead-singing Alien Gonzo and The Swedish Chef
- Frank Oz as Miss Piggy, Fozzie Bear, Animal and Sam Eagle
- Jerry Nelson as Robin, Statler, Ubergonzo, Floyd Pepper and Lew Zealand
- Brian Henson as Dr. Phil Van Neuter, Sal Minella, Alien Gonzo and Talking Sandwich
- Kevin Clash as Clifford
- Drew Massey as Fast Eddie
- Rickey Boyd as Troy
- Peter Linz as Shakes
- John Kennedy as Dr. Teeth and Alien Gonzo
- Adam Hunt as Scooter (voice only)
- Alice Dinnean as Alien Gonzo
- John Henson as Sweetums

Additionally, Whitmire, Kennedy, Linz, Massey and Boyd make on-screen cameos as hippies at Cape Doom.

=== Cameos ===
- F. Murray Abraham as Noah in Gonzo's dream.
- Josh Charles as Agent Barker, an operative of C.O.V.N.E.T. who is interrogated by Miss Piggy.
- Hollywood Hogan as himself (Man in Black), an operative of C.O.V.N.E.T.
- David Arquette as Dr. Tucker, a sadistic scientist who works at C.O.V.N.E.T. and is in charge of the medical science.
- Ray Liotta as the gate guard at C.O.V.N.E.T. who is affected by the mind-control spray bottle created by Bunsen and Beaker.
- Kathy Griffin as an armed guard of C.O.V.N.E.T. who falls in love with Animal.
- Katie Holmes as Joey Potter, a character from Dawson's Creek (uncredited)
- Joshua Jackson as Pacey Witter, a character from Dawson's Creek (uncredited)

== Production ==
As with the previous film Muppet Treasure Island (1996), veteran Muppet performer Frank Oz was unavailable for most of the shooting of Muppets from Space due to scheduling conflicts with his directing career. As a result, his characters Miss Piggy, Fozzie Bear, Animal, and Sam Eagle were performed on set by other puppeteers, with Oz later dubbing the voices in post-production. For most of the filming, Peter Linz performed Miss Piggy, John Kennedy performed Fozzie Bear and Sam Eagle, and Rickey Boyd performed Animal. Kennedy and Linz's voices can be heard in the film's theatrical trailer. In addition, Muppet performer Kevin Clash was also unavailable for most of the shooting, due to scheduling conflicts with his work on Sesame Street.

Filming began in November 1998 at Screen Gems Studios in Wilmington, North Carolina.

The film would mark the first appearance of Scooter since the theme park attraction Muppet*Vision 3D (1991). His voice was performed in Muppets from Space by Adam Hunt, the brother of Scooter's initial performer Richard Hunt.

The film's visual effects were provided by Illusion Arts.

=== Writing ===
An earlier draft of the story was written by Kirk Thatcher called Muppets in Space. In the screenplay, aliens abducted Kermit because they believed him to be their leader, leading the other Muppets to attempt to save him. A set of Welch's Jelly Glasses was produced based around this theme. According to the production notes featured on the DVD, the film was inspired by Gonzo's song in The Muppet Movie (1979), "I'm Going to Go Back There Someday".

When asked about his experience ten years after the film's release, co-writer Joseph Mazzarino revealed that he left the production before shooting started, due to changes made to his draft of the screenplay. He stated that his draft included parodies of Men in Black, Contact (both 1997) and Alien (1979), and that Randal Kleiser had been selected to direct the film. However, shortly before shooting began, the Jim Henson Company fired Kleiser, as they felt he was not "bringing enough vision", with Mazzarino subsequently hiring Timothy Hill as the new director, and the parodies were removed, as Hill wanted the film to be "more real".

In addition, Mazzarino stated that in his draft Gonzo did not turn out to be an alien. Instead, the aliens were getting signals from episodes of The Muppet Show and made themselves look like Gonzo because they considered him to be the "ultimate being". In the end, they would reveal their true forms and Gonzo would remain a "whatever", with his family being the Muppets.

=== Music ===
Muppets from Space: The Ultimate Muppet Trip

Soundtrack album by Various artists
- Released: July 13, 1999
- Genre: Soundtrack
- Labels: Sony Wonder; Epic

The Muppets chronology
Muppet Treasure Island: Original Motion Picture Soundtrack (1996)	Muppets from Space: The Ultimate Muppet Trip (1999)	Best of the Muppets featuring The Muppets' Wizard of Oz (2005)

Muppets from Space was the first Muppet film not to feature original songs, opting instead for a soundtrack consisting primarily of classic soul and funk tracks.

Some tracks were remade by contemporary artists, such as "Shining Star" by the Dust Brothers featuring Jeymes, and "Dazz" by G. Love and Special Sauce, recorded at Muscle Shoals Sound Studio in Sheffield, Alabama. The band was in the studio recording with Little Milton on the "Welcome to Little Milton" record. The band got a call from Jason Brown, their manager, while in the studio, to record a song for the movie. Will McFarlane, who was a Shoals/Malaco studio regular, and former Bonnie Raitt guitarist, played with the band on the song. Parliament's "Flash Light" was updated by George Clinton as a duet with Pepe the King Prawn named "Flash Light (Spaceflight)".

Two soundtracks were released featuring music from the film. The first album, Muppets from Space: The Ultimate Muppet Trip, consisted of the classic soul and funk tracks featured in the film and was jointly released by Sony Wonder, Epic Records, and Sony Music Soundtrax a day before the film's premiere, while the other was an album containing the film's score, which was composed by Jamshied Sharifi with additional work by Rupert Gregson-Williams. This album was released by Varèse Sarabande on August 13, 1999.

Earlier drafts of the film contained original songs, including the song "Eye 2 the Sky", written and recorded by Ween, which was not included on the soundtrack. This song was intended to be sung by Gonzo. Gonzo's performer Dave Goelz had also recorded a new rendition of "I'm Going to Go Back There Someday" for this film, a song which had originally appeared in The Muppet Movie (1979). This song was also dropped, but was included on the Muppets from Space soundtrack, also sung by Gonzo.

== Release ==
=== Marketing ===
To promote the film's theatrical release, Muppets from Space was accompanied with a marketing campaign with promotional tie-ins such as Wendy's and Travelodge. From May 17 to May 21, 1999, Wheel of Fortune had a theme called "Wheel Goes to the Movies" which featured a prize on the Wheel that included a four-day trip to Los Angeles for the world premiere of Muppets from Space. For the film's home video release, the pizza restaurant chain Sbarro promoted the film with six figurines in a set, along with Muppet pizza boxes and bags.

=== Home media ===
On October 26, 1999, the film was released on VHS and DVD with supplemental features such as a blooper reel and an audio commentary by Kermit the Frog, Gonzo, Rizzo, and director Tim Hill. It was released alongside The Muppets Take Manhattan on a double feature DVD by Sony Pictures Home Entertainment on June 9, 2008. The film received a Blu-ray release on August 16, 2011, also alongside The Muppets Take Manhattan, with all of the special features from the DVD included.

== Reception ==
=== Box office ===
Muppets from Space was released on July 14, 1999, in 2,265 theaters and grossed $7 million during its five-day opening frame. At the end of its theatrical run, the film grossed $22.3 million worldwide against its $24 million budget.

=== Critical response ===
On Rotten Tomatoes, 63% of 56 critics gave the film a positive review. The site's critical consensus reads: "If Muppets from Space lacks the magic and wit of its cinematic predecessors, this pleasingly silly space romp is funny and clever enough to make for better-than-average family entertainment." Metacritic summarized the critical response as "mixed or average", based on a weighted average score of 53 out of 100 from 24 critics. Audiences polled by CinemaScore gave the film an average rating of "A−" on an A+ to F scale.

Roger Ebert of the Chicago Sun-Times gave the film a two-star rating (out of four) and wrote "somehow Muppets From Space seemed a little disconsolate, a little low in energy, as if the ship (or the ark) had sailed." Conversely, Robin Rauzi of the Los Angeles Times gave the film a positive review, stating that "twenty years after The Muppet Movie and 30 after the beginning of Sesame Street, there is still life in these creations of felt, foam rubber and fake fur. With care, they will easily entertain and educate a third or fourth generation of children. The magic is back."

Michael Wilmington, reviewing for The Chicago Tribune, praised the puppeteers' performances, but remarked "[t]his picture isn't goofy or dreamy enough, however engaging it may be to re-encounter the intrigues of Miss Piggy, the wistfulness of Kermit or the weirdness of Gonzo. Or relax into the period funk soundtrack (including the O'Jays' "Survival," Earth, Wind and Fire's "Shining Star" and many others)." Lawrence Van Gelder of The New York Times felt the "[f]renetic movement and loud music overwhelm warmth and compassion, and the balance of character, plot, irreverent humor and innate decency that made some of the earlier Muppet movies so welcome is lost."

In a 2000 interview, Frank Oz stated that the film was not "up to what it should have been" and "not the movie that we wanted it to be."
