= It's a Very Merry Muppet Christmas Movie =

2002 American fantasy comedy television film

- DVD cover
- Based on: The Muppets by Jim Henson
- Written by: Tom Martin; Jim Lewis
- Directed by: Kirk R. Thatcher
- Starring: Steve Whitmire; Dave Goelz; Bill Barretta; Eric Jacobson; David Arquette; Joan Cusack; Matthew Lillard; William H. Macy; Whoopi Goldberg
- Music by: Mark Watters
- Country of origin: United States
- Original language: English

Production
- Executive producers: Juliet Blake; Brian Henson
- Producers: Martin G. Baker; Warren Carr
- Cinematography: Tony Westman
- Editor: Gregg Featherman
- Running time: 88 minutes
- Production companies: The Jim Henson Company; NBC Studios

Original release
- Network: NBC
- Release: November 29, 2002

It's a Very Merry Muppet Christmas Movie is a 2002 American musical fantasy comedy television film directed by Kirk R. Thatcher and written by Tom Martin and Jim Lewis. The film premiered November 29, 2002 on NBC and is the first television film featuring the Muppets. The film was produced by The Jim Henson Company and NBC Studios.

It stars Muppet performers Steve Whitmire, Dave Goelz, Bill Barretta, and Eric Jacobson, as well as David Arquette, Joan Cusack, Matthew Lillard, William H. Macy, and Whoopi Goldberg. The plot centers on Kermit the Frog who, after losing all hope for saving the Muppet Theatre, is assisted by an angel who shows him a world in which he was never born. The film is a homage to Frank Capra's 1946 film It's a Wonderful Life, which has a similar plot.

This was the first Muppets production without the involvement of veteran performer Frank Oz. Instead, Eric Jacobson performed Oz's characters Fozzie Bear, Miss Piggy, and Animal, marking his feature film debut as those characters.

It's a Very Merry Muppet Christmas Movie is the final Muppets production before the characters and franchise were acquired in 2004 by the Walt Disney Company from the Jim Henson Company. It is one of the few Muppets-related productions that are currently not owned by the Walt Disney Company, and along with Sam and Friends, is currently owned by NBCUniversal.

== Plot ==
During the holiday season, the Muppet Theater is going through financial hardship, and the Muppets are seeking Kermit the Frog for guidance. Kermit is very upset and irritable, lamenting over lost money, fear of losing the theater, and feeling that he is not useful to anyone. An angel named Daniel brings this up with his Boss as they review what has gone on with Kermit in the past hours.

Hours earlier, Kermit prepares a Christmas show with his fellow Muppets with Bobo the Bear playing Santa Claus. Kermit is approached by Rachel Bitterman, a banker/real estate agent who says she will foreclose the Muppet Theater if Kermit does not pay her. Pepe the King Prawn leaves the Muppets because he has fallen in love with Bitterman. Miss Piggy leaves the Muppets to go and work in Hollywood. While trying to raise money to pay Bitterman, Kermit attempts to find a celebrity to participate in his Christmas play, to no avail. Kermit travels out to California and retrieves Miss Piggy, who gets fired from working as an extra on the TV series Scrubs.

Meanwhile, after learning from Pepe that the deadline is midnight, Bitterman changes it to 6:00 p.m. Pepe overhears this and sets about informing Kermit about the deadline change, but Pepe keeps being interrupted. The Muppets perform their Christmas musical Moulin Scrooge (a parody of the 2001 film Moulin Rouge!) and Pepe continues trying to talk to Kermit. The musical is a success, concluding with a standing ovation. After the show, Pepe finally explains to Kermit that the deadline has changed and shows him the contract. Kermit sends Fozzie to deliver the money to Bitterman. Fozzie confronts a crazed nature-show host (spoofing Steve Irwin), before being dyed green at a Christmas tree lot and mistaken for "that green guy who stole Christmas" by a gang of angry residents of "Whatville". Fozzie then goes through a steam bath and returns to his normal appearance. When Fozzie eventually makes it to the bank and Bitterman's office, he goes through a gigantic web of burning lasers leading to Bitterman's office several times, before finally discovering that he is too late, and that he has grabbed the wrong bag containing clothes for the Salvation Army following his incident at the Christmas tree lot.

After witnessing these events, the Boss allows Daniel to help Kermit. When Daniel arrives, Kermit wishes that he was never been born, and Daniel shows Kermit what would have happened if he had not existed. In the world without Kermit, Bitterman has turned the park near the Muppet Theater into a shopping mall called Bitterman Plaza, the Muppet Theater itself has become a nightclub called Club Dot owned by Bitterman, Doc Hopper's French-Fried Frog Legs (first seen in The Muppet Movie) has become a famous fast-food restaurant, and all of Kermit's friends have fallen into various detrimental situations.

Kermit has Daniel restore him back to his reality and returns to the Muppet Theater. Bitterman arrives to shut the theater down and fights with Miss Piggy. Pepe appears and announces he has made the Muppet Theater into a historical landmark, foiling Bitterman's plans. Defeated, an enraged Bitterman storms out of the Muppet Theater.

Outside, the Muppets sing "We Wish You a Merry Christmas".

== Cast ==
- David Arquette as Daniel, an angel who appears to Kermit at Christmas.
- Joan Cusack as Rachel Bitterman, a spoiled, rich young banker/real estate developer.
- Matthew Lillard as Luc Fromage, a foppish French choreographer.
- Whoopi Goldberg as The Boss, the Creator of the Universe.
- William H. Macy as Glenn, an angel.
- Mel Brooks as Joe Snow (voice only), parodying Sam the Snowman from Rudolph the Red-Nosed Reindeer
- Chantal Strand as Nancy Nut-What, parodying Taylor Momsen's portrayal of Cindy Lou Who from the 2000 film How the Grinch Stole Christmas
- Robin Mossley as Nicki Nut-What, parodying Bill Irwin's portrayal of Lou Lou Who from How the Grinch Stole Christmas
- Cameron McDonald as an Australian safari animal tracker, parodying Steve Irwin
- Dave "Squatch" Ward as a Sally Ann Santa Claus

=== Muppets performers ===
- Steve Whitmire as Kermit the Frog, Rizzo the Rat, Beaker, Statler (puppetry only, with one unubbed line), Bean Bunny, one of the Elvises and Mr. Poodlepants
- Dave Goelz as Gonzo, Bunsen Honeydew, Waldorf, Beauregard and Zoot
- Bill Barretta as Pepe the King Prawn, Bobo the Bear, Johnny Fiama, Swedish Chef, Lew Zealand, Howard Tubman, one of the Elvises and Rowlf the Dog
- Eric Jacobson as Miss Piggy, Fozzie Bear, Animal, Tree-Carrying Rat, one of the Elvises and Yoda from Star Wars
- Brian Henson as Scooter, Janice, Director and Sal Minella
- Kevin Clash as Sam Eagle (voice only)
- John Henson as Sweetums
- John Kennedy as Dr. Teeth, Sam Eagle (puppetry only, deleted scene only), Rat and Frog
- Drew Massey as Robin the Frog and Floyd Pepper (both puppetry only)
- Alice Dinnean as Frog
- Jerry Nelson as Robin the Frog, Statler, Floyd Pepper, Pops, Crazy Harry, Woman Shopper, Tree-Carrying Rat and Announcer (all voice only)
- Allan Trautman as Joe Snow (puppetry only) and Eugene the Tuba Player

Additional Muppet Performers: Geoff Redknap, Denise Cheshire, Adam Behr and Gord Robertson (uncredited; John Pattison)

=== Cameo guest stars ===
- Carson Daly as himself
- Snoop Dogg as himself (deleted scene only)
- Kelly Ripa as herself
- Joe Rogan as himself
- Molly Shannon as herself
- Robert Smigel as Triumph the Insult Comic Dog

Cast and crew of Scrubs

- Zach Braff as himself/Dr. John "J.D." Dorian
- Sarah Chalke as herself/Dr. Elliot Reid
- Neil Flynn as himself/Janitor
- Bill Lawrence as himself
- John C. McGinley as himself/Dr. Perry Cox
- Judy Reyes as herself/Nurse Carla Espinosa

== Critical reception ==
It's a Very Merry Muppet Christmas Movie received generally positive reviews. On Rotten Tomatoes, it holds an 83% approval rating. Barbara Schultz of Common Sense Media rated it 4 out of 5, describing it as a "classic story retold in funny, touching Muppet romp."

== Production notes ==
Veteran Muppet performer Jerry Nelson was in poor health during filming, resulting in most of his characters being puppeteered on set by others and later dubbed by Nelson in post-production. The sole exception was Lew Zealand, Nelson's character, who was performed by Bill Barretta, Additionally, Steve Whitmire puppeteered for Nelson as Statler but one undubbed line was kept intact during the climax. Sam Eagle, a character originally performed by Frank Oz, was voiced in the film by Kevin Clash, with John Kennedy handling the on-set puppetry but with one undubbed performance in one of the deleted scenes.

Scooter, performed in this film by Brian Henson, makes his first significant appearance since the death of his original performer, Richard Hunt. Another of Hunt's characters, Janice, is also performed by Henson and has her first speaking role since Hunt's death.

The film features the original song "Everyone Matters", sung by Kermit and Gonzo within the alternate world where Kermit had never been born. The song is reprised at the conclusion of the film. Additionally, the movie pays homage to the classic Muppet song "Rainbow Connection" with a statue of Kermit in a park, dedicated "to the lovers, the dreamers, and you."

Snoop Dogg was originally cast in a cameo role, but his scene was removed due to backlash over his involvement in adult entertainment at the time, specifically Girls Gone Wild.

The movie was filmed after the September 11 attacks; one scene, set in the world in which Kermit was never born, shows the Twin Towers visible in the background. This was due to the photo background mural being created prior to the attacks.

== See also ==
- List of Christmas films
- List of films about angels
- Santa Claus in film
