= Dr. Teeth and the Electric Mayhem =

Fictional rock band from The Muppet Show

- The six members of The Electric Mayhem (top, left to right); Floyd, Lips, Animal, (bottom, left to right) Janice, Dr. Teeth, Zoot.

Background information
- Also known as: The Electric Mayhem
- Origin: New Orleans, Louisiana, United States
- Genre: Rock
- Years active: 1975–present
- Label: Walt Disney
- Members: Dr. Teeth; Animal; Floyd Pepper; Janice; Zoot; Lips
- Past members: Clifford

Dr. Teeth and the Electric Mayhem, or simply The Electric Mayhem, are an American Muppet rock sextet that debuted in 1975 on the puppet sketch comedy television series The Muppet Show. Serving as the show's house band, the group’s personalities and appearances were inspired by prominent real-life rock and jazz musicians. They subsequently appeared in various Muppet films and television specials and have also recorded album tracks and covered numerous songs. The Electric Mayhem are a sextet: Dr. Teeth on vocals and keyboards, Animal on drums, Floyd Pepper on vocals and bass, Janice on vocals and lead guitar, Zoot on saxophone, and Lips on trumpet. The band's members were originally performed by Jim Henson, Frank Oz, Jerry Nelson, Richard Hunt, Dave Goelz, and Steve Whitmire, respectively; they are presently performed by Bill Barretta, Eric Jacobson, Matt Vogel, David Rudman, Goelz, and Peter Linz, respectively.

The group made their debut in 1975's The Muppet Show: Sex and Violence, the pilot for The Muppet Show. Dr. Teeth and Animal were designed by Henson, Zoot was designed by Bonnie Erickson, while Floyd and Janice were designed by Michael K. Frith. Animal, Floyd and Zoot also played in the Muppet Show pit band, performing the opening and closing themes and underscoring most of the Muppet Show performances. Lips and occasionally Janice appeared in the orchestra in later episodes. Lips joined the band as the sixth member in the fifth season of the series, and made some appearances with the group after The Muppet Show ended production; the group later reverted to its original five member line-up, until Lips returned in 2011's The Muppets.

The band's first film role was performing the song "Can You Picture That?" in The Muppet Movie. They also performed "Night Life" and participated in "Happiness Hotel" in The Great Muppet Caper and performed "Jingle Bell Rock" in A Muppet Family Christmas. They appeared in The Muppets Take Manhattan (sans Lips) where Dr. Teeth sang "You Can't Take No For An Answer". Following the deaths of two of the group's puppeteers, Henson and Hunt, they were limited to brief instrumental background music throughout the 1990s. However, the Electric Mayhem backed Miss Piggy for a song in The Muppets' Wizard of Oz and performed alongside Miley Cyrus in the 2008 Studio DC: Almost Live television special. They have been a mainstay in the Muppets' viral video efforts of the 2010s and have a featured role in 2015's The Muppets as the house band on the show-within-a-show Up Late with Miss Piggy. The same year, they released two music videos for "Jungle Boogie" (featuring Sam Eagle) and "Kodachrome".

An Electric Mayhem "live" tour with audio-animatronic versions of the puppets and rock band My Morning Jacket performing the characters was proposed in the 2000s by The Walt Disney Company but ultimately abandoned. The band performed a live five-song set at the Outside Lands Music and Arts Festival on August 6, 2016. The Electric Mayhem appears as the marquee artist on Rock 'n' Roller Coaster Starring The Muppets, a roller coaster attraction at Disney's Hollywood Studios in Walt Disney World; the band held a live performance for the attraction's opening.

The Muppets Mayhem, a series about the Electric Mayhem recording their first eponymous studio album, premiered on Disney+ on May 10, 2023.

== Members ==
Character	Principal performers
Dr. Teeth	Jim Henson (1975–1990); John Kennedy (1991–2003); Bill Barretta (2005–present)
Animal	Frank Oz (1975–2000); John Kennedy (2001–2003); Eric Jacobson (2002–present)
Floyd Pepper	Jerry Nelson (1975–2003); John Kennedy (2005–2006); Matt Vogel (2008–present)
Janice	Fran Brill (1975); Eren Ozker (1976-1977); Richard Hunt (1977–1991); Matt Vogel (2000); Brian Henson (2002–2003); Tyler Bunch (2005); David Rudman (2008–present)
Zoot	Dave Goelz (1975–present)
Lips	Steve Whitmire (1980–2016); Peter Linz (2017–present)

Despite featuring Dr. Teeth's name prominently in the band's name, the group officially has no frontman and instead has described itself as a "rocktocracy". The original pilot episode of The Muppet Show also featured Jim, a Muppet caricature of Henson on banjo.

=== Dr. Teeth ===
- Performed by Jim Henson (1975–1990), John Kennedy (1991–2003), Bill Barretta (2005–present)

Dr. Gerald Teeth Jr. is the gravelly-voiced lead singer and keyboardist. He is green-skinned and red-haired with a large grinning mouth of teeth including a gold tooth supposedly fashioned by melting down his gold records. He sports a scruffy red beard with no mustache, a fur vest, a striped shirt and a floppy purple top hat. He has arms so long that additional puppeteers are required to guide them; this design enabled Henson to work the Dr. Teeth puppet while another performer acted as Dr. Teeth's hands in order to play the keyboard. His self-introduction in The Muppet Movie was typically grandiose: "Golden teeth and golden tones. Welcome to my presence." He often misuses long words and mangles verb conjugation. Jim Henson originally performed him, basing the character on New Orleans musician Dr. John. Henson claimed that Dr. Teeth was one of the most difficult characters to play due to the harshness of the character's voice. He was designed by Henson and Michael K. Frith and built by Don Sahlin. He debuted in The Muppet Show: Sex and Violence.

Dr. Teeth only sings lead vocals on the second Muppet pilot and during the first season and these songs were only written before Rowlf the Dog had become firmly established as the regular Muppet pianist in the show's orchestra pit. Later performances mostly feature lead vocals by Floyd or Janice and only a few featured Dr. Teeth. His speaking roles got even smaller after Henson's death; an exception was the 1991 Muppets stage show Muppets on Location: Days of Swine and Roses, the voice being performed by John Kennedy. He performed Dr. Teeth from 1991 to 2003 but made only very brief appearances with very little dialogue, some examples being the 1999 film Muppets from Space and once in the music video for the "We Are Family" charity song in 2002.

Bill Barretta took over the role beginning with The Muppets' Wizard of Oz. Dr. Teeth's first major speaking role since Henson's death was in Statler and Waldorf's very own show, Statler and Waldorf: From the Balcony where Victor Yerrid performed him. Barretta, however, has been performing Dr. Teeth consistently since 2005.

In the 2023 series The Muppets Mayhem, Dr. Teeth is revealed to be an actual doctor, having worked in his family's dentistry business before leaving with Floyd to start the band. After an argument with the band, he rechristens the band's name simply as "The Electric Mayhem" out of parity for the other members.

=== Animal ===
- Performed by Frank Oz (1975–2000), John Kennedy (2001–2003), Eric Jacobson (2002–present)

Animal is the group's primitive drummer, and the most published member of the band, being the only member to have a speaking role in every feature film and the only member in the regular cast of the Muppet Babies spin-off cartoon. He is named for his wild man behavior and frenetic drumming. Original performer Frank Oz has stated that Animal's character can be summed up in five words: sex, sleep, food, drums, and pain.

Some speculate the character of Animal is based on either Keith Moon, John Bonham, Ginger Baker, Mike Baird, or Levon Helm, while others have suggested Mick Fleetwood. In the April 8, 2002, episode of Inside the Actors Studio, Billy Joel claimed that Liberty DeVitto was the inspiration for Animal. However, Animal's initial appearance in the 1974 pilot for The Muppet Show occurred two full years before DeVitto made his first recording (on Joel's 1976 album Turnstiles). Others say there is no evidence that Animal was based on anyone specifically, and is simply an amalgam of common stereotypes about rock drummers.

Oz performed Animal from his first appearance until 2000; he has been performed regularly by Eric Jacobson since his 2002 appearance in It's a Very Merry Muppet Christmas Movie. In Muppet Babies, he was voiced by Howie Mandel (1984–1985) and by Dave Coulier (1986–1991). Animal was also played by Kevin Clash in Muppets Tonight and by Bill Barretta in MuppetFest (the first Muppet fan convention). Animal's drumming was performed by British jazz and big band drummer Ronnie Verrell. He has had numerous appearances on television in advertising and on a U.S. postage stamp.

In the 2023 series The Muppets Mayhem, it is revealed that Animal was raised by Floyd after being abandoned on his doorstep as a baby.

=== Floyd Pepper ===
- Performed by Jerry Nelson (1975–2003), John Kennedy (2005–2006), Matt Vogel (2008–present)

Sgt. Floyd Pepper is the group's bassist and backing vocalist. A laid-back hippie with a pink body and long orange hair, he usually wore a green army cap or sometimes while in the pit, a slightly fancier cap of stiffer, glittery material and a red uniform with epaulets and ornate gold braid on the buttons. He plays his bass left-handed; and although he's been seen playing a variety of bass guitars over time, he appears to have settled for playing Fender basses. The character was originated by Jerry Nelson until 2003. At this time, Nelson retired from performing most of his characters, citing health reasons and John Kennedy took over the role beginning with The Muppets' Wizard of Oz. Matt Vogel took over in A Muppets Christmas: Letters to Santa and is Floyd's current performer. Author Christopher Finch says that Floyd is most like Nelson and if there were a spin-off of The Muppet Show centering on his band, Floyd would probably emerge as the central figure. He was designed by Michael K. Frith and built by Dave Goelz. He debuted in The Muppet Show: Sex and Violence.

A battle of the egos occurs whenever he and Miss Piggy are on screen together as he loves to poke fun at her airs and graces. He is also somewhat arrogant, referring to himself in a Muppet Magazine article as one real cool dude and during The Muppet Show (season 1 episode 23) he says to Kermit the Frog: "Kermit, you are talking to Floyd Pepper! The hippest of the hip! I mean I have a room for life at the home of the chronically groovy!". His name and pink color are homages to the band Pink Floyd, and Sgt. Pepper's Lonely Hearts Club Band, the album by the Beatles. He appears backstage more often than the other band members.

Although Dr. Teeth is the leader, Floyd is the one who sings lead most often. Some of the songs he sang on The Muppet Show include: "New York State of Mind", "Ain't Misbehavin'", "While My Guitar Gently Weeps" and "50 Ways to Leave Your Lover". He has a close relationship with Janice and is Animal's close friend and handler. In books like The Case of The Missing Mother, by James Howe, Animal is practically Floyd's pet. In The Muppets Mayhem, it is revealed that Floyd raised Animal from a young age, and inspired a young Dr. Teeth to become a musician.

Floyd has declared himself to be an excellent songwriter—when the band briefly went on strike, one of his conditions was that he be allowed to write new theme music for the show—but with no apparent contradiction, admits that everyone hates his music. "If I didn't know I was a genius," he once declared, "I wouldn't listen to the trash I write." He nonetheless seems to have made a small fortune on advertising jingles during one of the band's sabbaticals.

Some sources state that Floyd is based on the guitarist Jeff Baxter, who is a studio musician and a former member of both Steely Dan and the Doobie Brothers.

=== Janice ===
- Performed by Richard Hunt (1977–1992), David Rudman (2008–present)

Janice is the group's guitarist and backing vocalist with a valley girl personality. She has blonde hair, big eyelashes and lips, and usually wears a brown hat with a turquoise gem and a feather. Though she regularly performed vocals, she actually only sang lead a couple of times on the show. She also acted in sketches periodically, most notably as wisecracking Nurse Janice in 'Veterinarian's Hospital', a recurring parody of medical dramas; in the latter role, she dispenses with much of her flower child lingo. Her name is an homage to Janis Joplin, and she bears a close resemblance to folk musician Joni Mitchell. Janice plays her guitar left-handed. Her favourite guitar is a Gibson Les Paul with cherry sunburst colour scheme.

Janice was involved with Zoot in the first season of The Muppet Show but paired up with Floyd Pepper at the start of season two. Janice was performed by Eren Ozker during the first season of The Muppet Show (without the valley-girl voice), then she was performed by Richard Hunt until his death in 1992. Briefly, in The Muppet Show pilot, in the Muppet Meeting Films and in one Season 1 sketch she was performed by Fran Brill. Due to the lack of female Muppet performers, Janice has, since Ozker's departure, consistently been played by a man.

Muppet characters are frequently paired together based on how well puppeteers perform as a team. Richard Hunt and Jerry Nelson had established themselves as a team prior to The Muppet Show. Therefore, the change in Janice's performer may have been the reason for her relationship shifting from Zoot to Floyd. After Hunt's death, her character was faded back to brief non-speaking background appearances until 2000's Muppet Race Mania in which she was performed by Matt Vogel. Brian Henson also provided her voice for It's a Very Merry Muppet Christmas Movie and the video game Muppets Party Cruise. In The Muppets' Wizard of Oz, she was performed by Tyler Bunch. Her most recent performer is David Rudman, who first performed her in Studio DC: Almost Live. John Lovelady performed her for one appearance in 1975.

A running gag in some Muppet movies was that during a scene in which several characters were excitedly talking at once and someone called for silence, Janice would be the last one still talking on a topic with no apparent connection to the situation. In The Muppets Take Manhattan: "So I told him 'Look, buddy, I don't take my clothes off for anybody, even if it is artistic,' and... Oh". Another example from The Great Muppet Caper, she says: "Look, Mother. It's my life. OK. So if I want to live on a beach and walk around naked... Oh".

Janice is the only member of the band apart from Animal to have appeared on the animated series Muppet Babies. In her single appearance, she was portrayed as slightly older than the main characters and able to read. She was voiced by Dave Coulier who regularly voiced baby versions of Animal, Bunsen Honeydew and Bean Bunny.

In the 2023 series The Muppets Mayhem, Janice is revealed to have an estranged twin sister.

=== Zoot ===
- Performed by Dave Goelz (1975–present)

Zoot is a teal-colored, balding saxophone player with dark glasses and a high-crowned blue felt hat that is generally a laid-back fellow of few words. His name refers to the 20th-century saxophonist Zoot Sims and per designer Bonnie Erickson is modeled after Latin jazz artist Gato Barbieri. He is performed by Dave Goelz. He was conceived as a burned-out, depressed 50-year-old musician but according to Goelz when the role was assigned to him, he did not know how to perform that type of character. He, therefore, made the character mainly communicate through his playing rather than by speaking.

Zoot spoke much more in the first season where he was often seen dancing with Janice in the "At the Dance" sketches. Goelz stated that he tried to give most of Zoot's lines away to other characters, particularly Floyd. Floyd's performer Jerry Nelson was not performing full-time in the first season which may explain Zoot originally having more dialogue. Since his eyes are hidden by his shades, he often appears oblivious to events around him—during the band's first meeting with Kermit the Frog and Fozzie Bear as depicted in The Muppet Movie, he briefly forgot his own name which Floyd described as Zoot "skip[ping] the groove again"—but he can be sharper than he seems. When Floyd declared the band to be "anklin'" during its brief strike, only Zoot seemed dubious, noting "The frog's been good to us."

Zoot's claim to fame was playing the final off-key note to the end theme of the show; he then looks into his saxophone with a bewildered expression, checks his music, gives a satisfied nod, looks around at the other musicians and gives the same nod. The note played is the lowest note on the baritone saxophone, while most of Zoot's other playing has the sound of a tenor saxophone and his instrument appears to be an alto saxophone.

In A Muppets Christmas: Letters to Santa, it is revealed that he celebrates Hanukkah.

=== Lips ===
- Performed by Steve Whitmire (1980–2016), Peter Linz (2017–present)

Lips is the band's mumbling, yellow-haired trumpet player who joined the Electric Mayhem during the final season of The Muppet Show. His name is inspired by the imagery of lips seen on posters for The Rocky Horror Picture Show, one of Whitmire's favorite films. He has yellow frizzy hair that has been compared to a chrysanthemum (much to his chagrin), a goatee, and a permanent squint. His appearances on the Muppet Show were few and far between and when he did appear in the later episodes or movies, he rarely did anything besides play the trumpet. One of his few speaking appearances was in the Shirley Bassey episode where he sang a line of "Barnyard Boogie."

He was mainly created so that Whitmire could have a character to perform in the band. His lack of character development was apparently due to Whitmire's uncertainty about performing Lips. He was less experienced as a puppeteer at the time and wanted to use a voice like Louis Armstrong but was afraid of offending African Americans. After The Muppet Christmas Carol, he was not seen at all until the 2009 NBC special Christmas in Rockefeller Center. He also appeared in The Muppets (2011). He also appeared and spoke (albeit very briefly) in the 2014 movie Muppets Most Wanted. He appears (and speaks on several occasions) in the 2015 series The Muppets having been completely rebuilt, as the original puppet from his Muppet Show days disintegrated on set during the filming of the 2015 music video "Kodachrome". Lips speaks frequently in The Muppets Mayhem (2023), with his dialogue mainly consisting of unintelligible mumbling and occasionally a determinable sentence.

A recurring gag in The Muppets Mayhem and media released around the same time is that Lips has inexplicable connections to a myriad of celebrities and other people the Mayhem come across. This history includes, but is not limited to, being a nursery school teacher, inspiring The Bangles song "Walk Like an Egyptian", and introducing Paula Abdul to MC Skat Kat.

=== Past members ===
==== Clifford ====
Clifford, performed by Kevin Clash, was briefly made a member of the Electric Mayhem (as a percussionist) in 1990. His only appearances with the group were in the television special The Muppets at Walt Disney World and minor publicity material.

==== Jim ====
Jim was featured in the original pilot episode as a Muppet caricature of Jim Henson on banjo.

== Discography ==
=== Albums ===
Title	Album details	Peak chart positions							Sales	Certifications
Title	Album details	US	CAN	US Soundtracks	US Kid Albums	UK	AUS	US Digital	Sales	Certifications
The Electric Mayhem (The Muppets Mayhem: Music From the Disney+ Original Series)	Released: May 10, 2023; Label: Walt Disney Records; Formats: LP, digital	—	—	10	1	37	—	—	5,000	

=== Songs ===
Year	Title	Featured Artist(s)	Album
1979	"Can You Picture That?"		The Muppet Movie
1979	"Sweet Tooth Jam"		non-album song
1979	"Little Saint Nick"	John Denver	John Denver and the Muppets: A Christmas Together
1981	"Night Life"		The Great Muppet Caper
1981	"Loves Me Like A Rock"	Paul Simon	The Muppet Show
1984	"Saying Goodbye"	Miss Piggy, Kermit the Frog, Scooter, Gonzo, Camilla, Floyd Pepper, Fozzie Bear, Rowlf the Dog and the Muppets	The Muppets Take Manhattan
1984	"You Can't Take No For Answer"	Paul Stanley	The Muppets Take Manhattan
1987	"Jingle Bell Rock"		A Muppet Family Christmas
1990	"Rockin' All Around the World"	Clifford	The Muppets at Walt Disney World
1992	"Fozziwig's Party"		The Muppet Christmas Carol
2001	"Far Away From You"		non-album song
2005	"Tenderly"		The Muppets' Wizard of Oz
2005	"Nap Time"		The Muppets' Wizard of Oz
2005	"The Witch Is in the House"	Miss Piggy	The Muppets' Wizard of Oz
2006	"The Man with the Bag"		The Muppets: A Green and Red Christmas
2006	"Run, Run Rudolph"		The Muppets: A Green and Red Christmas
2006	"'Zat You, Santa Claus?"		The Muppets: A Green and Red Christmas
2009	"Bohemian Rhapsody"	Queen + The Muppets	Single
2011	"Pictures in My Head"		The Muppets
2015	"Jungle Boogie"	Sam Eagle	non-album songs
2015	"Kodachrome"		non-album songs
2016	"You Are the Sunshine of My Life"	Jack White	non-album songs
2016	"Home"		Outside Lands 2016
2016	"Home"		The Hollywood Bowl
2021	"Dancing in the Moonlight"		Muppets Haunted Mansion
2021	"Mr. Blue Sky"		non-album song
2023	"Rock On"		The Muppets Mayhem
2023	"Gotta Be"		The Muppets Mayhem
2023	"True Colors"		The Muppets Mayhem
2023	"The Sound of Us"		The Muppets Mayhem
2023	"Have a Little Faith in Me"		The Muppets Mayhem
2023	"Join Together"		The Muppets Mayhem
2023	"We Are One"	Ringo Starr	The Muppets Mayhem
2023	"Can You Picture That?"		The Muppets Mayhem
2023	"God Only Knows"		The Muppets Mayhem
2023	"On Our Way"		The Muppets Mayhem
2023	"Bridge Over Troubled Water"		The Muppets Mayhem
2023	"Rock and Roll All Nite"		The Muppets Mayhem
2023	"Gonna Get There"		The Muppets Mayhem
2023	"Believe in Us"		The Muppets Mayhem
2023	"All You Need is Love"		The Muppets Mayhem
2023	"MAYHEM!"		The Muppets Mayhem
2026	"Song 2"		Rock 'n' Roller Coaster Starring The Muppets
2026	"Born to be Wild"	Camilla the Chicken	Rock 'n' Roller Coaster Starring The Muppets
2026	"Love Rollercoaster"	Jennifer Hudson and Questlove	Rock 'n' Roller Coaster Starring The Muppets
2026	"Rock! Rock! (Till You Drop)"	Def Leppard	Rock 'n' Roller Coaster Starring The Muppets
2026	"Walking on Sunshine"	Kelly Clarkson	Rock 'n' Roller Coaster Starring The Muppets

== In popular culture ==
- In Farscape: The Peacekeeper Wars (2004), after a confrontation with some Muppet-style aliens, Crichton makes a comment about "being shot at by the Electric Mayhem".
- In an episode of Adult Swim's Robot Chicken ("Plastic Buffet"), Dr. Teeth and the Electric Mayhem are featured in a fake VH1 Behind the Music sketch detailing the band's activities after The Muppet Show. It shows Dr. Teeth earning a living as a piano teacher and claims that no one has seen Zoot since he was arrested in Japan for possessing a suitcase filled with thirty-seven pounds of hash, which is a parody of the 1980 Paul McCartney marijuana bust. Also, in a fake episode of The Howard Stern Show, Janice reveals that Tommy Lee gave her Hepatitis C and that she only has 5 years to live (referencing similar claims made by actress Pamela Anderson); when Stern ignores her distress and asks if Janice will show him her breasts, she angrily refuses. Finally, a possible comeback for the Electric Mayhem—a performance on Star Search—ends in tragedy when Animal has to be put down for viciously attacking host Ed McMahon. The sketch ends with Floyd sadly stating that a reunion of the Electric Mayhem is impossible without Animal and Zoot as Dr. Teeth plays a piano duet with Rowlf the Dog and a sickly Janice coughs in the background.
- The Family Guy episode "Herpe the Love Sore" begins with Peter and Lois watching an episode of Behind the Music about the Electric Mayhem.
- Electric Mayhem performed Seven Nation Army at the 2026 FIFA World Cup final halftime show.
