= Sam Eagle =

Muppet character

- The Muppets character
- First appearance: The Muppet Show: Sex and Violence (1975)
- Created by: Jim Henson; Jon Stone; Marshall Brickman; Norman Stiles
- Performed by: Frank Oz (1975–2000); Kevin Clash (2002–2003); Eric Jacobson (2005–present)

In-universe information
- Species: American bald eagle
- Gender: Male
- Occupation: Political commentator
- Nationality: American

Sam Eagle is a Muppet character from the sketch comedy television series The Muppet Show, best known for his intense American patriotism and disciplined manner of being. Sam originated on the television series, where he was performed by Frank Oz. Sam has appeared in every Muppet film; as himself in The Muppet Movie, The Great Muppet Caper, The Muppets Take Manhattan, Muppets from Space, and The Muppets, as well as the Head Schoolmaster in The Muppet Christmas Carol, Samuel Arrow in Muppet Treasure Island and a CIA agent in Muppets Most Wanted. The character also appears in the role of an ABC executive for broadcast standards and practices in the television series, The Muppets.

== Background ==
Also known as Sammy or Samuel, Sam's overtly patriotic spirit distinguishes him from the rest of the Muppet cast, as does his general stuffiness and pomposity. It has been a running gag in either The Muppet Show, or the Muppet movies, that his nationalism is represented towards the United States. He is an American bald eagle, America's national bird, covered in light blue feathers with a perpetually furrowed, black unibrow and a literally balding head. His name references Uncle Sam, the national personification of the U.S.

== Character traits ==
Sam often railed against the 'low brow' entertainment he claimed was on the show, and often tried to bring 'dignity and class' to the performances, usually without any real success. During the first season, Sam would introduce two Muppet characters named Wayne and Wanda who would often sing various songs that were considered by Sam to be 'normal' and 'high brow' when compared to the rest of the show and its cast.

On the show, Sam acts as a censor and comments on his being under-appreciated. He often gives self-important lectures in which he espouses some conservative idea only to find himself forced to stop in embarrassment at risk of sounding like a hypocrite. On one occasion, he gives a lecture about conservationism in which he reads a list of endangered animal species that he feels are the focus of misguided conservation efforts, only to sheepishly withdraw his statement when he realizes that his own species is included. In another sketch, he lectures on indecency because all people are nude underneath their clothes, leaving the podium in embarrassment upon realizing that all birds are similarly nude underneath their feathers.

Throughout the first season of The Muppet Show, Sam introduces his favorite singing duo, Wayne and Wanda, with gushing aplomb, praising them for their appropriateness. Although they are never able to finish a song (their routines always end with slapstick violence), Sam still adores them because they appeal to his conservative sensibilities: the couple sings old standards like "You Do Something to Me" and "It's Only a Paper Moon".

Though he claims to be a cultured bird, close observation reveals that Sam knows nothing about culture, especially the culture of his own country. He has mistaken Beethoven for a playwright and thinks The Sound of Music was written by William Shakespeare. When informed that ballet dancer Rudolf Nureyev would be the guest star (Episode 213), Sam declared Nureyev as his favorite opera singer. Also when Nureyev arrived, Sam didn't recognize him and ejected him from the theater. Sam is often hostile toward others who do not possess similar views to his own.

Sam does not interact with the guest stars of the show as often as the rest of the cast, but he is featured prominently in several episodes. In one, he throws casually dressed guest star Rudolf Nureyev out of the building in a fit of temper, mistaking him for a bum. Although he is forgiven by Nureyev, he is still disheartened because Mr. Nureyev (whom he believes is an opera singer rather than a ballet dancer) did not live up to his expectations. In another, he seeks out Zero Mostel – who he believes to be "a man of dignity", and thus, a kindred spirit – only for Mostel to literally mock him behind his back during his usual tirade. Similarly, Sam makes a bet with Kermit the Frog claiming that Mozart would never dress flamboyantly like Elton John, who he believes "dresses like a stolen car." Scooter proves him wrong by showing a painting of Mozart with his powdered wig, coat, and stockings and thus Sam is forced to introduce John in a flamboyant, albeit patriotic, costume and literally eat his own hat. In the Candice Bergen episode, he was shocked to find that Italian actor Marcello Mastroianni was not the name of a soup. During the third season's Halloween episode, Sam confronts Alice Cooper. Railing against the audience and "indecency" and "low brow" humor, Sam calls Cooper a "demented, sick, degenerate, barbaric, naughty, Freako!" Rather than being insulted by these comments as Sam was intending, Cooper takes it as a compliment and thanks Sam, to which Sam despairingly retorts, "Freakos one, civilization zero."

On Muppets Tonight, Sam periodically hosted a debate show a la The McLaughlin Group, entitled From The Eagle's Nest. Unfortunately, the only permanent debaters were Miss Piggy's dimwitted nephews Andy & Randy, who routinely got the better of him. His tagline for the show was "Let's talk POLITICS!"

On Jim Henson's Animal Show, Sam was the only Muppet character to make a crossover appearance, guest-starring in the third-season episode "Bald Eagle".

== Film appearances ==
Sam has appeared in every major Muppet feature film, usually only as a supporting roles (The Muppet Movie, The Great Muppet Caper, The Muppets Take Manhattan, The Muppet Christmas Carol, Muppets from Space). However, in Muppet Treasure Island, he played the first mate Samuel Arrow and thus takes a more active role in the story.

In The Muppets, Sam is employed at a political news television station hosting a segment called "Everything Stinks", though he soon finds himself reuniting with the other Muppets. He is later seen as one of the phone operators of The Muppet Telethon and as part of the barbershop quartet performing "Smells Like Teen Spirit" with Rowlf the Dog, Link Hogthrob and Beaker. He also participates in the telethon's "Rainbow Connection" finale.

In Muppets Most Wanted, Sam plays a fairly major role as a CIA agent who reluctantly collaborates with Interpol agent Jean Pierre Napoleon (Ty Burrell) to solve a series of burglaries in Europe. Sam and Napoleon interrogate the Muppets but learn nothing useful, and they mistakenly arrest Kermit the Frog and Fozzie Bear for the thefts.

In the TV series The Muppets, Sam is a main character and is in charge of the broadcast standards and practices for ABC. He also develops a romantic interest in Janice.

== Casting history ==
Primary Performers

- Frank Oz: The Muppet Show: Sex and Violence (1975) - Muppet RaceMania (2000)
- Kevin Clash: Muppet Treasure Island (puppetry only), It's a Very Merry Muppet Christmas Movie (2002) - Muppets Party Cruise (2003) (voice only)
- Eric Jacobson: The Muppets' Wizard of Oz (2005) - Present

Other Performers

- John Kennedy: Muppets from Space (1999) (puppetry only), It's a Very Merry Muppet Christmas Movie (2002) (puppetry only)
- Drew Massey: Statler and Waldorf: From the Balcony Episodes 11, 15, 18 and 33 (2005–2006)
