= Rowlf the Dog =

Muppet character

- The Muppets character
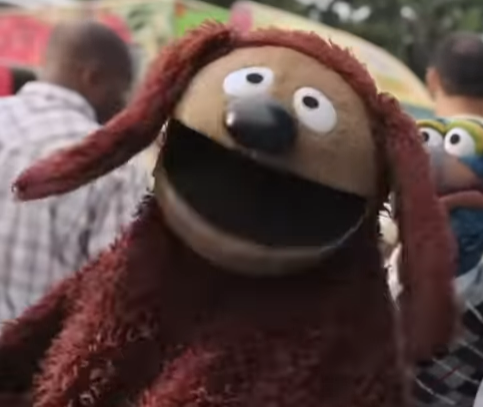
- First appearance: Various Purina dog food commercials (1962)
- Created by: Jim Henson
- Performed by: Jim Henson (1962–1990); Bill Barretta (1996–present)

In-universe information
- Species: Muppet Dog
- Gender: Male
- Occupation: Pianist
- Nationality: American

The character was introduced as the spokesman of Purina Dog Chow television commercials aired in Canada in 1962.

Rowlf the Dog is a Muppet character created and originally performed by Jim Henson. Known most notably as the resident pianist on the sketch comedy television series The Muppet Show, Rowlf is an anthropomorphic scruffy brown dog of indeterminate breed with a rounded black nose and long floppy ears. Laid-back and wisecracking, his humor is characterized as deadpan and as such, he is one of few Muppets who is rarely flustered by the show's prevalent mayhem. Henson's closest collaborators and family members have claimed Rowlf to be the Muppet character most similar to Henson's real-life personality.

Rowlf was created in 1962 being introduced as the spokesman of Purina Dog Chow television commercials aired in Canada, in which he appeared with Baskerville the Hound. Rowlf was designed and performed by Henson, and was built by Don Sahlin; it was Sahlin's first Muppet construction. In 1966, Ideal Toys produced Rowlf and Kermit the Frog puppets. Rowlf subsequently appeared on The Jimmy Dean Show from 1963 to 1966, becoming the first Muppet to appear regularly on network television. In the 1970s and 1980s, Rowlf appeared as a regular character on The Muppet Show (1976–1982), as well as in The Muppet Movie (1979), The Great Muppet Caper (1981), and The Muppets Take Manhattan (1984). After a brief hiatus following Henson's death, Rowlf returned to the forefront in Muppet films and television series with Bill Barretta performing the character since Muppets Tonight (1996).

== Career ==
=== The Jimmy Dean Show ===
Rowlf rose to popularity as Jimmy Dean's sidekick on The Jimmy Dean Show, performed by Henson with Frank Oz assisting. He was the first Muppet with a regular spot on network television, appearing in 85 of the 86 total episodes from 1963 to the show's end in 1966. Jimmy Dean stated that Rowlf's segments were one of the most popular parts of the show, and that Rowlf drew two thousand fan letters a week. Henson was so grateful for the exposure Dean offered on his show, even proposing that Dean take a 40% stake in Henson's company. Dean refused, however, later saying in 2005, "I didn't do anything to earn that." Dean and Rowlf appeared together for the last time in an episode of The Ed Sullivan Show airing on October 8, 1967, performing "Friendship" while doing the "herd of cows" gag.

=== Sesame Street ===
In 1968, Rowlf appeared with Kermit the Frog on the pitch reel for Sesame Street. At the end of the pitch reel, Rowlf is depicted as being eager to join the Sesame Street cast, while Kermit seems reluctant to do so; however, it was Kermit who became a Sesame star, while Rowlf appeared only in one filmed segment and was never a part of the show's regular cast.

=== The Muppets ===
In 1976, Rowlf joined the recurring cast of The Muppet Show as the show's pianist. Rowlf also played Dr. Bob, the wisecracking doctor in the recurring medical drama parody skit "Veterinarian's Hospital", alongside nurses Janice and Miss Piggy. Though considered one of the main characters, he rarely interacted with any of the backstage plots involving the show's weekly guest stars.

Rowlf has a primary role in The Muppet Movie (1979). In 1984, Baby Rowlf debuted playing a toy piano during a musical number in The Muppets Take Manhattan. This fantasy sequence with the Muppets as babies was so popular that it resulted in the successful animated cartoon spinoff Muppet Babies. He was voiced on that program by Katie Leigh.

Jim Henson's last public performance as Rowlf before his death was for The Muppets at Walt Disney World, as it premiered on May 6th 1990, 10 days before Jim's death. For several years afterward, the character was retired out of deference to Henson's memory (only returning for silent cameos in The Muppets Celebrate Jim Henson, The Muppet Christmas Carol and Muppet Treasure Island), as he was both the first Muppet to achieve popularity and, according to some sources, the character closest to Jim Henson's personality, with Henson's son Brian saying in the introduction to episode 117 of The Muppet Show: "Kermit was my father's best known character, but a lot of people think he was more like Rowlf in real life except he couldn't play the piano as well."

Since 1996, Rowlf has been portrayed by puppeteer Bill Barretta. Barretta has gradually transitioned into the role. Rowlf's first words since Henson's death were in the second episode of Muppets Tonight. Rowlf also had several lines of dialogue in The Muppet Show Live (2001) and spoke two lines of dialogue ("Hey, Kermit!" and "Yeah! Heh, heh. Oh!") in It's a Very Merry Muppet Christmas Movie (2002). In 2005, Rowlf had a 190-word monologue in the second episode of Statler and Waldorf: From the Balcony. Rowlf appeared in the "Keep Fishin'" music video for rock band Weezer. Although he's only briefly seen, Rowlf had a more prominent role in the behind-the-scenes making-of special that accompanied it, Weezer and the Muppets Go Fishin'.

Additionally, Bill Barretta recorded the vocals as Rowlf singing "The Christmas Party Sing-Along" for the 2006 The Muppets: A Green and Red Christmas album.

Rowlf and Kermit appeared together at the 2011 Disney D23 Expo to honor Jim Henson's posthumous induction as a Disney Legend, singing a live duet of "The Rainbow Connection", as they were Henson's first two Muppet characters.

Rowlf appears in The Muppets (2011), initially saddened he wasn't included in the montage depicting the principal Muppets being reunited (Rowlf was asleep, and was simply woken up by Kermit and easily convinced to join the cause), and helps rebuild the Muppet theater. He also performs "Smells Like Teen Spirit" in a barbershop quartet with Sam the Eagle, Beaker, and Link Hogthrob during the Muppet Telethon, as well as an unwilling (and captive) Jack Black.

As of 2014, Rowlf is on long-term display at the Center for Puppetry Arts in Atlanta, Georgia.

In 2019, Rowlf appeared with Darci Lynne on America's Got Talent: The Champions, singing "Can't Smile Without You".

In 2025, Rowlf sang as a special guest in The Game Awards 2025, along with Miss Piggy

In 2026, he appears again on the backdoor pilot The Muppet Show, a revival of the original show

== Filmography ==
- Various Purina dog food commercials (1962) (TV)
- Various IBM commercials (1966-75) (TV)
- The Jimmy Dean Show (1963–1966) (TV)
- Our Place (1967) (TV)
- Sesame Street (Number Song Series #9) (1969) (TV)
- The Muppet Show (1976–1981) (TV)
- The Muppet Movie (1979)
- The Great Muppet Caper (1981)
- The Muppets Take Manhattan (1984)
- Muppet Babies (1984–1991) (TV) (voiced by Katie Leigh)
- A Muppet Family Christmas (1987) (TV)
- Sing-Along, Dance-Along, Do-Along (1988)
- The Jim Henson Hour (1989) (TV)
- The Muppets at Walt Disney World (1990) (TV)
- The Muppets Celebrate Jim Henson (1990) (TV)
- The Muppet Christmas Carol (1992)
- Muppet Treasure Island (1996)
- Muppets Tonight (1996–1998) (TV)
- Muppets from Space (1999)
- It's a Very Merry Muppet Christmas Movie (2002) (TV)
- The Muppets' Wizard of Oz (2005) (TV)
- A Muppet Christmas: Letters to Santa (2008) (TV)
- Studio DC: Almost Live (2008)
- The Muppets (2011)
- Lady Gaga and the Muppets Holiday Spectacular (2013) (TV)
- Muppets Most Wanted (2014)
- The Muppets (2015–2016) (TV)
- Muppet Babies (2018) (TV) (voiced by Matt Danner)
- America's Got Talent: The Champions (2019) (TV)
- Muppets Haunted Mansion (2021) (Disney+) – Appearance of the Organist
- "The Muppet Show (2026 TV special)" (2026) (Disney+)

== Album ==
A solo album titled Ol' Brown Ears is Back was released by BMG in 1993 and featured 14 songs recorded by Jim Henson as Rowlf. The album had been recorded in 1984 but went unreleased until three years after Henson's death.
