= Animal (Muppet) =

Muppet character

- The Muppets character
- First appearance: The Muppet Show: Sex and Violence (1975)
- Created by: Jim Henson (designer); Dave Goelz (builder)
- Performed by: Frank Oz (1975–2000); Eric Jacobson (2002–present)

In-universe information
- Species: Muppet monster
- Gender: Male
- Occupation: Drummer
- Nationality: American

Animal is a Muppet character from the sketch comedy television series The Muppet Show, and the wild and frenzied monster of the fictional band Dr. Teeth and the Electric Mayhem, who is a drummer. The character was performed originally by Frank Oz and currently by Eric Jacobson. His original concept sketches, which show him as a very hairy human, were drawn by Bonnie Erickson and Jim Henson.

== Characteristics ==
Original performer Frank Oz has stated that Animal's character can be summed up in five words: sex, sleep, food, drums, and pain. Animal's vocabulary is generally monosyllabic and limited to guttural shouts and grunts, often repeating a few simple phrases, as well as his trademark gravelly laugh. During performances, Animal is usually chained to the drum set by a collar around his neck, as his musical outbursts are extremely violent. In some episodes, he has been summoned to chase off performers who are 'being annoying'.

From The Muppet Movie (1979), as the members of Electric Mayhem introduce themselves:

Animal: [flails and babbles wildly, pants, and yells as Fozzie clutches an also-frightened Kermit in fear]
Floyd: Oh yeah, that's Animal. Show 'em whatcha do, Animal!
Animal: Ah, what do! Eat drums! [loudly chews on a cymbal]
Dr. Teeth: No, no, beat drums, beat drums.
Animal: [opens his eyes wide] Beat drums! Beat drums! [hits the third tom-tom drum three times with his head, grunting before each hit]
Floyd: Down, Animal!
Animal: Down!
Floyd: Back!
Animal: Back!
Floyd: Sit!
Animal: Sit! [laughs shortly as he gets back up to look at Scooter, who is introducing himself]

Animal's bushy eyebrows and hair, outrageous behavior, and wild drumming has sometimes been compared to several classical hard-partying Id-worshipping rock drummers, such as the Who's Keith Moon, Led Zeppelin's John Bonham, and Cream's Ginger Baker. Animal is a savant, versatile session drummer, to back Muppet tunes, capable even of finishing a slow song, if the singer is a nice lady. He can match both Buddy Rich and Harry Belafonte in drum-offs on The Muppet Show, Questlove on Late Night with Jimmy Fallon in 2011, and Dave Grohl on The Muppets in 2015, agreeing to a tie.

Animal shows a talent for jazz in a television advert for the Renault Clio car with French footballer Thierry Henry.

Animal has sometimes run afoul of Muppet Show guests. In 1981, the aforementioned scene with Buddy Rich ends with the seasoned pro learning Animal's gonzo style, and performing it with twice the speed and proficiency. Animal throws a drum onto the irascible entertainer's head, who later quipped "I'm just glad it wasn't a piano contest." When he repeatedly interrupted Rita Moreno's Emmy winning rendition of Fever with loud drumming outbursts, she became annoyed and slammed his head between a pair of cymbals (to which Animal responded by saying "Uh, that's my kinda woman!", before passing out). In another episode, he chased Mark Hamill and Angus McGonagle the Argyle Gargoyle offstage at Kermit's request after they snuck onstage. In another episode, Animal became hostile toward Dudley Moore when Moore tried to replace the band with a programmable, music-playing robot. On another occasion, however, Animal is starstruck by James Coburn after the movie tough-guy demonstrates his own violent streak in a parodic manner:

Coburn: There's a right way and a wrong way to handle aggression...
Animal: Aggressionnnnn...
Coburn: You don't want to bust a chair up like that – [takes the chair Animal is mauling] you bust it up like this! [smashes chair to bits on the staircase banister (forcing Animal to duck) and coolly walks back up to his dressing room]
Animal: [eyes wide] My kinda guy! [races after him] Jimmy! Jimmy!

A common gag involves someone imparting a figure of speech to Animal: Animal turns to the audience, his eyes go wide and he goes berserk, taking the figure of speech literally. For example, Jim Nabors once spoke the traditional theatrical good luck wish "Break a leg", whereupon Animal indulged him by trying to break Nabors's leg. Another gag would occasionally occur when the band plays a slow song: Animal will get about halfway through and then after announcing "Too slow!" launch into a faster-paced version of the song. The band would usually comment that Animal lasted much longer than they thought he would.

Animal is a literal skirt-chaser. In The Muppets Take Manhattan (1984), he chases a female student out of the auditorium, chanting "Woo-maaaan!" after her. He also chases cars. While some Animal gags involve a role reversal, or a moment of intellectualism, others are still more subtle, such as in this piece of dialog from The Great Muppet Caper (1981), where it is revealed that Animal has a passion for the impressionist paintings of Pierre-Auguste Renoir:

Kermit the Frog: What's wrong with the drummer? He looks a little crazed.
Zoot: Oh, he's just upset about missing the Rembrandt exhibit at the National Gallery.
Animal: [Correcting him in a wild, angry tone] Renoir!!

In the film Muppets from Space (1999), Animal meets his match in the form of a security guard played by Kathy Griffin—after chasing her down a hallway with his "Woo-man" call, he later comes running back around the corner, yelling "HELP HELP!" with Griffin calling after him about how they'll settle down, buy a house, and have children.

Ty Pennington commented about the possibility of Animal having ADHD when the character appeared on an episode of Extreme Makeover: Home Edition.

Animal's lack of social grace is on display at the very end of The Muppet Movie. After the credits, his face fills the screen as he admonishes the audience: "Go home! Go home!"

== Performers ==
Animal was performed by Frank Oz from his first appearance in the pilot for The Muppet Show until his 2000 appearance in the video game Muppet RaceMania. He has been performed regularly by Eric Jacobson since his 2002 appearance in It's a Very Merry Muppet Christmas Movie.

On The Muppet Show, Animal's drumming was performed by Ronnie Verrell up until his death in 2002.

Animal has had roles in all Muppet movies, and was the only member of The Electric Mayhem to be included regularly on the Muppet Babies cartoons.

Animal was voiced by Howie Mandel in the first two seasons of Muppet Babies, followed by Dave Coulier in subsequent seasons. Animal was performed by Rob Mills in the series finale of The Jim Henson Hour, and he was occasionally performed by Kevin Clash on Muppets Tonight in the absence of Frank Oz. John Kennedy also briefly performed Animal in a 2002 commercial for MasterCard, as well as for the 2003 video game Muppets Party Cruise. Drew Massey performed Animal in Statler and Waldorf: From the Balcony. In Jim Henson's Little Muppet Monsters, Animal was voiced by Hal Rayle (who also voiced Gonzo and Miss Piggy).

== Appearances in other media ==
In 1993, Animal performed The Surfaris' song "Wipe Out" on the Muppet Beach Party album. Animal's track was also released as a single in the UK where it reached number 38 in the charts.

Animal was the official mascot of the U.S. Ski Team during the 1998 Winter Olympics. He was also featured in one of eleven commemorative stamps issued by the U.S. Postal Service.

In 2010, Animal was featured in a viral video alongside power-pop band OK Go, where he challenged the band's drummer, Dan Konopka, to a staring contest. Animal ultimately wins and forces Konopka to be his roadie for a year.

Animal and his fellow Muppets made a guest appearance on the Halloween 2011 episode of the wrestling TV show WWE Raw, where he was a guest timekeeper. Animal is present in the 2011 film The Muppets, having gone into anger management therapy since the Muppets disbanded. He also made a special appearance on Late Night with Jimmy Fallon as a guest drummer with The Roots house band, and on the eighth UK series of The X Factor in 2011, where he drummed for Olly Murs on his song "Dance with Me Tonight".

In 2022, Animal was featured in the Game Awards prior to the "Best Sound/Music" award

On July 28, 2023, Animal made a surprise appearance with My Morning Jacket to close out their headlining set at the Newport Folk Festival.

== Filmography ==
- The Muppet Show (1976–1981) (TV)
- The Muppet Movie (1979)
- The Great Muppet Caper (1981)
- The Muppets Take Manhattan (1984)
- Muppet Babies (1984–1991) (TV) (voiced by Howie Mandel, Dave Coulier)
- A Muppet Family Christmas (1987) (TV)
- The Muppets at Walt Disney World (1990) (TV)
- The Muppet Christmas Carol (1992) - Appearance as Fozziwig party entertainer
- Muppet Treasure Island (1996) - Appearance as himself
- Muppets Tonight (1996–1998) (TV)
- Muppets from Space (1999)
- It's a Very Merry Muppet Christmas Movie (2002) (TV)
- The Muppets' Wizard of Oz (2005) (TV) - Appearance as himself
- Studio DC: Almost Live (2008) (TV)
- A Muppets Christmas: Letters to Santa (2008) (TV)
- The Muppets (2011)
- Lady Gaga and the Muppets Holiday Spectacular (2013) (TV)
- Muppets Most Wanted (2014)
- The Muppets (2015–2016) (TV)
- Muppet Babies (2018–2022) (TV) (voiced by Dee Bradley Baker)
- Muppets Now (2020) (Disney+)
- Muppets Haunted Mansion (2021) (Disney+) – Appearance as a member of Madame Pigota's ghost band
- The Muppets Mayhem (2023) (Disney+)
