= John Kennedy (puppeteer) =

American puppeteer

- Born: Plainfield, Indiana, U.S.
- Occupations: Puppeteer; voice actor
- Years active: 1991–present

John Kennedy is an American puppeteer and voice actor. He is known for his work with The Jim Henson Company since 1990. He was born in Plainfield, Indiana. In 1991, Kennedy succeeded Jim Henson as Dr. Teeth, after which Bill Barretta took over in 2005. In 2006, he performed Kermit the Frog on the Disney Cruise Line show, Muppets Ahoy!

== Filmography ==
=== Film ===
Year(s)	Production	Role	Other notes
1999	Muppets from Space	Additional Muppets, Fozzie Bear, Sam Eagle	Assistant performer
2001	Cats & Dogs		Puppeteer
2002	The Country Bears	Zeb Zoobler	Puppeteer
2002	Kermit's Swamp Years	Arnie the Alligator, Blotch the Bullfrog, Monkey	Performer; Direct-to-video film
2002	It's a Very Merry Muppet Christmas Movie	Dr. Teeth	Performer; Television film
2005	The Muppets' Wizard of Oz	Angel Marie, Floyd Pepper	Performer; Television film
2009	Old Dogs		Puppeteer

=== Television ===
Year(s)	Production	Role	Other notes
1991–94	Dinosaurs	Baby Sinclair, Sid Turtlepuss	Puppeteer
1995	Eureeka's Castle		Assistant performer
1996–98	The Wubbulous World of Dr. Seuss	Little Cat C, Horton the Elephant, Mr. Knox, Norval the Fish, Sam-I-Am, Felix Finkledooper, Milo, Alvin, Announcer, Armand, Birthday Bird, Celli, Delivery Bird, Downer Than Down Whozit, Earl, Flitzpizzle, The Grinch	Performer
1996	Muppets Tonight	Additional Muppets	Performer
1997–2020	Sesame Street	Chicken, Dish, Fred, Ned The Green, Four-net Horn Player, Ball of Wax, Artie Abrams, Muppet Horse, The Elephant, Monkey Bunny, Additional Muppet	Performer
1998–99	Brats of the Lost Nebula		Puppeteer
2002	Play with Me Sesame		Performer
2003	Animal Jam	DJ #1	Performer
2005–07	Jack's Big Music Show	Mel	Performer
2007	Fetch! with Ruff Ruffman	Himself, Bernie the Pig	Episode: "Ruff's Big Break"
2010–11	Pajanimals	Apollo	Performer
2017	Julie's Greenroom	Toby the Dog	Performer
2019	Helpsters	Uncle Squish	Performer; 1 episode
2019–21	The Slugs & Bugs Show	Morty the Raccoon	Performer
2020	The Not-Too-Late Show with Elmo		Performer

=== Video games ===
Year(s)	Title	Role	Notes
1996	Muppet Treasure Island	Dr. Teeth	Voice
2000	Muppet RaceMania	Dr. Teeth	Voice
2003	Muppets Party Cruise	Dr. Teeth, Animal	Voice

=== Other appearances ===
Year(s)	Title	Role	Notes
2017	The Muppets Take the Bowl	Additional Muppets	Performer
2018	The Muppets Take the O2	Additional Muppets	Performer

== Books ==
Kennedy has written instructional books on puppeteering, aimed at younger audiences:

- John Kennedy (2004-01-04). Puppet Mania!. North Light Books. ISBN 978-1-58180-372-3.
- John Kennedy (2006-04-26). Puppet Planet: The Most Amazing Puppet-Making Book in the Universe. North Light Books. ISBN 978-1-58180-794-3.

Preceded by Jim Henson	Performer of Dr. Teeth; 1991–2003	Succeeded by Bill Barretta
Preceded by Jerry Nelson	Performer of The Amazing Mumford; 2004; 2018–present	Succeeded by None
Preceded by Jerry Nelson	Performer of Floyd Pepper; 2005–06	Succeeded by Matt Vogel
