= Bill Barretta =

American puppeteer

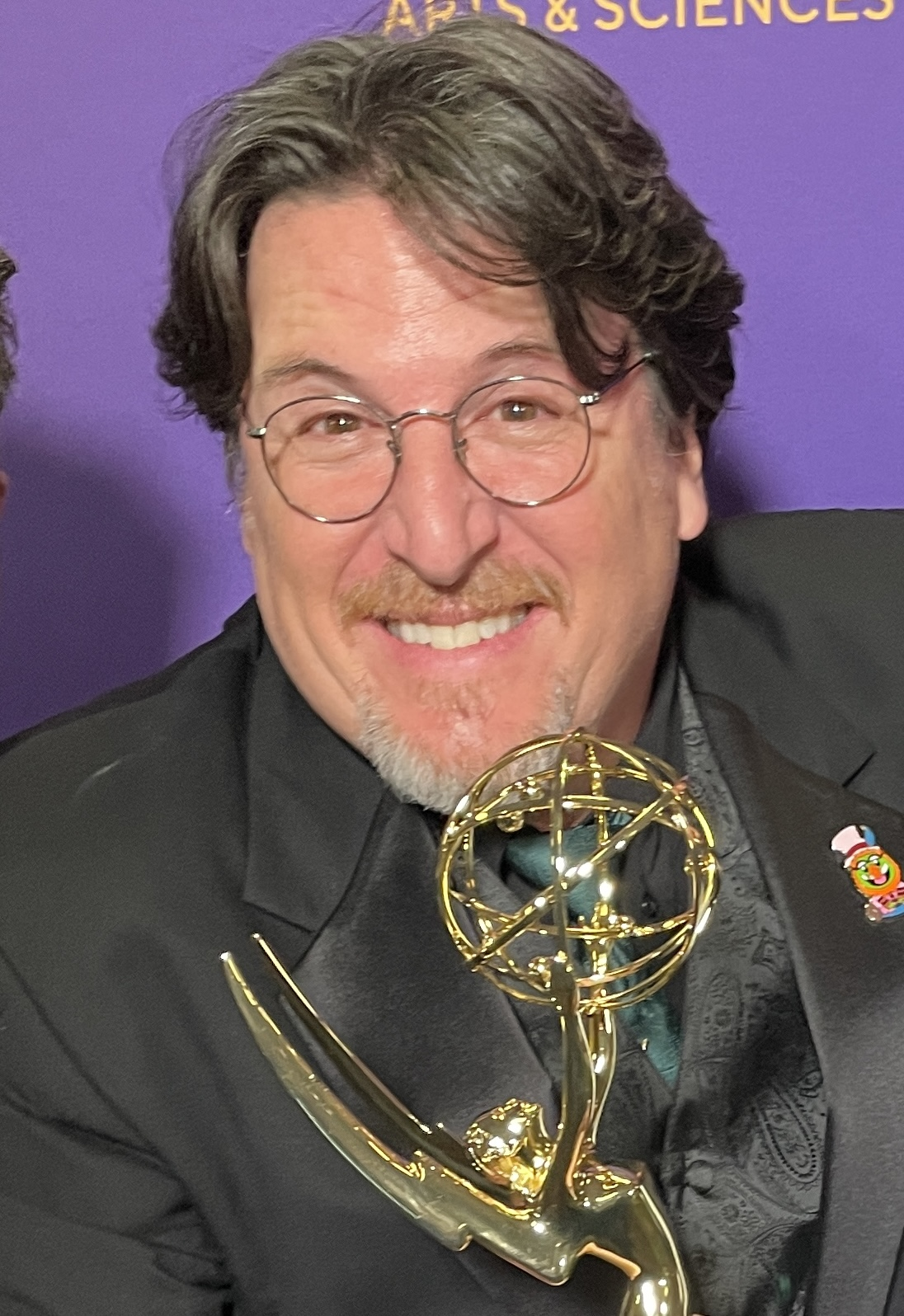
- Barretta in 2023
- Born: William Barretta; Yardley, Pennsylvania, U.S.
- Occupations: Puppeteer; producer; writer; director; actor
- Years active: 1991–present
- Relatives: Gene Barretta (brother)

William Barretta is an American puppeteer, producer, writer, director, and actor, best known for his involvement with the Muppets. He performs the Muppet characters Pepe the King Prawn, Bobo the Bear, Johnny Fiama, Rowlf the Dog, The Swedish Chef, and Dr. Teeth. He originated the role of Louie, Elmo's dad, on Sesame Street.

== Career ==
Barretta began performing with The Jim Henson Company in 1991, as the body performer of Earl Sinclair on Dinosaurs. He later developed several new characters for Muppets Tonight, including Pepe the King Prawn, Johnny Fiama, and Bobo the Bear.

Barretta has succeeded several of Jim Henson's roles, such as Dr. Teeth, Rowlf the Dog, and Swedish Chef. He performed Clueless Morgan in Muppet Treasure Island (1996). He additionally served as Muppet captain on The Muppets and Muppets Most Wanted. He played the main puppet character Phil Phillips in The Happytime Murders (2018).

For Sesame Street, Bill Barretta originated the role of Elmo's dad, Louie, originally appearing in direct-to-video specials. He based Louie's voice on Louis Prima's.

Barretta has served as a producer on various Muppet projects, including It's a Very Merry Muppet Christmas Movie (2002) and The Muppets' Wizard of Oz (2005). In 2014, he served as a co-producer on Muppets Most Wanted. He also served as an executive producer on the ABC series, The Muppets. For Disney+, he produced Muppets Haunted Mansion and co-created The Muppets Mayhem, winning a Children's and Family Emmy Award in 2023.

== Filmography ==
=== Film ===
Year	Title	Role	Notes
1995	Murder in the First	Man on the Street	
1995	Born to Be Wild	Gorilla Team	
1996	Muppet Treasure Island	Clueless Morgan, Blind Pew, Swedish Chef, Jacques Roach, Mudwell the Mudbunny (singing)	Performer
1999	Muppets from Space	Pepe the Prawn, Bobo the Bear, Johnny Fiama, Bubba the Rat, The Swedish Chef, Rowlf the Dog, Cosmic Fish #2	Performer
1999	The Adventures of Elmo in Grouchland	Additional Muppets	Performer
2002	Kermit's Swamp Years	Croaker, Horace D'Fly, Roy the Frog, Turtle #2	Performer; Direct-to-video film
2002	It's a Very Merry Muppet Christmas Movie	Pepe the King Prawn, Johnny Fiama, Bobo the Bear, Rowlf the Dog, Swedish Chef, Lew Zealand, Howard Tubman, Additional Muppets	Performer (also producer); Television film
2005	The Muppets' Wizard of Oz	Pepe the Prawn, Dr. Teeth, Johnny Fiama, Swedish Chef, Lew Zealand, Bubba the Rat, Additional Muppets	Performer (also producer); Television film
2011	The Muppets	Rowlf the Dog, Dr. Teeth, Pepe the Prawn, Bobo, Swedish Chef	Performer
2014	Muppets Most Wanted	Rowlf the Dog, Dr. Teeth, Pepe the King Prawn, The Swedish Chef, Big Mean Carl, Bobo the Bear, Carlo Flamingo, Leprechaun Security Guard, Baby Boss	Performer
2018	The Happytime Murders	Phil Phillips, Junkyard, Boar	Performer

=== Television ===
Year(s)	Title	Role	Notes
1991–1994	Dinosaurs	Earl Sinclair (in-suit performer), Nick (in-suit performer), Rabid Caveman, Various	Performer
1994	Jim Henson's Animal Show	Armstrong the Chicken Hawk, Vernon the Grizzly, Baby Bear, Dullard the Aardvark, Jared the Tiger, Lazlo the Hyena, Randall the Zebra, Timothy the Owl, Vernon the Grizzly	Performer
1995	Mr. Willowby's Christmas Tree	Bear	Performer; CBS special
1996–1998	Muppets Tonight	Bobo the Bear, Johnny Fiama, Pepe the Prawn, Rowlf the Dog, Big Mean Carl, Clueless Morgan, Howard Tubman, David Hoggselhoff, Zippity Zap, Snookie Blyer, Ernst Stavros Gropuer, additional characters	Performer
1996	The Wubbulous World of Dr. Seuss	Uncle Berklummer	Performer
2001	Jack and the Beanstalk: The Real Story	Thunderdell	Also writer
2002–2007	Kim Possible	Jackie the Jackal, Jilly from Jersey, Motor Ed's 'Main Bro'	Voice role
2006	Nightmares & Dreamscapes: From the Stories of Stephen King	Savage Commando	Uncredited
2006–2010	Sesame Street	Louie	Performer
2007	Tinseltown	Bobby	Performer (also director)
2008	Studio DC: Almost Live	Pepe the King Prawn, Dr. Teeth, Rowlf the Dog, The Swedish Chef, Bobo the Bear	Performer
2008	A Muppets Christmas: Letters to Santa	Pepe the King Prawn, Dr. Teeth, Rowlf the Dog, The Swedish Chef, Bobo the Bear, Pigeon Dad	Performer; NBC Television film
2011	Saturday Night Live	Rowlf the Dog	Performer, Episode: "Jason Segal/Florence + The Machine"
2012	Jimmy Kimmel Live!	Dr. Teeth	Performer
2015–2016	The Muppets	Rowlf the Dog, Dr. Teeth, Pepe the King Prawn, Swedish Chef, Bobo the Bear, Big Mean Carl, Mahna Mahna, Howard Tubman	Performer, Director: "Dave Caplan & Jordan Reddout & Gus Hickey"
2015	Muppet Moments	Rowlf the Dog, Bobo the Bear, Pepe the King Prawn	Performer (also director)
2017–2020	Unbreakable Kimmy Schmidt	Lonny DuFrane/Mr. Frumpus	3 episodes; Actor/Puppeteer
2018	Muppet Babies	Dr. Teeth	Voice role
2019	Drop the Mic	Pepe the King Prawn	2 episodes; Puppeteer/voice
2020	Muppets Now	Pepe the King Prawn, The Swedish Chef, Howard Tubman, Big Mean Carl, Dr. Teeth, Bobo the Bear, Bubba the Rat	Performer; director and executive producer
2021	Muppets Haunted Mansion	Pepe the King Prawn, Rowlf the Dog, Dr. Teeth, Johnny Fiama, Howard Tubman, Bobo the Bear, Big Mean Carl, Andy Pig, Bubba the Rat, Beautiful Day Monster, Clean Gene the Behemoth, Party Tomato	Performer; teleplay and story by, executive producer
2023	The Muppets Mayhem	Dr. Teeth	Performer; co-creator and executive producer
2026	The Muppet Show	Rowlf the Dog, Pepe the King Prawn, Dr. Teeth, Bobo the Bear (uncredited)	Performer

=== Video games ===
Year	Title	Role	Notes
2000	Muppet Race Mania	Pepe the King Prawn, Bobo the Bear, Johnny Fiama, Swedish Chef	Voice role
2000	Muppet Monster Adventure	Pepe the King Prawn, Swedish Chef	Voice role
2003	Muppets Party Cruise	Pepe the King Prawn, Rowlf the Dog, Bobo the Bear, Johnny Fiama, Swedish Chef	Voice role

=== Other appearances ===
Year	Title	Role	Notes
2014	Piper's Picks TV	Swedish Chef	Performer
2017	The Muppets Take the Bowl	Pepe the King Prawn, Rowlf, The Swedish Chef, Dr. Teeth, Bobo, Mahna Mahna	Puppeteer/voice, live show at the Hollywood Bowl, Sept. 8–10
2018	The Muppets Take the O2	Pepe the King Prawn, Rowlf, The Swedish Chef, Dr. Teeth, Bobo, Mahna Mahna	Puppeteer/voice, live show at the O2, July 13–14
2021	The Muppets Christmas Caroling Coach	Pepe the King Prawn	Voice; theme park show at Disneyland
2025	World of Color Happiness!	Rowlf, Dr. Teeth, Pepe the King Prawn, The Swedish Chef	Performer (prerecorded footage); theme park show
2026	Rock 'n' Roller Coaster Starring The Muppets	Dr. Teeth, Rowlf, Pepe the King Prawn, The Swedish Chef, Bobo the Bear, Johnny Fiama	Performer (prerecorded footage); theme park attraction

Preceded by Jim Henson	Performer of Rowlf the Dog; 1996 – present	Succeeded by None
Preceded by David Rudman	Performer of The Swedish Chef; 1996 – present	Succeeded by None
Preceded by John Kennedy	Performer of Dr. Teeth; 2005 – present	Succeeded by None
Preceded by Jim Henson	Performer of Mahna Mahna; 2005 – present	Succeeded by None
Preceded by None	Pepe the King Prawn; 1996 – present	Succeeded by None
Preceded by None	Bobo the Bear; 1996 – present	Succeeded by None
Preceded by None	Carl the Big Mean; 1996 – present	Succeeded by None
Preceded by Jerry Nelson	Performer of Lew Zealand; 2002 – 2005	Succeeded by Matt Vogel
