= Eric Jacobson =

American puppeteer (born 1971)

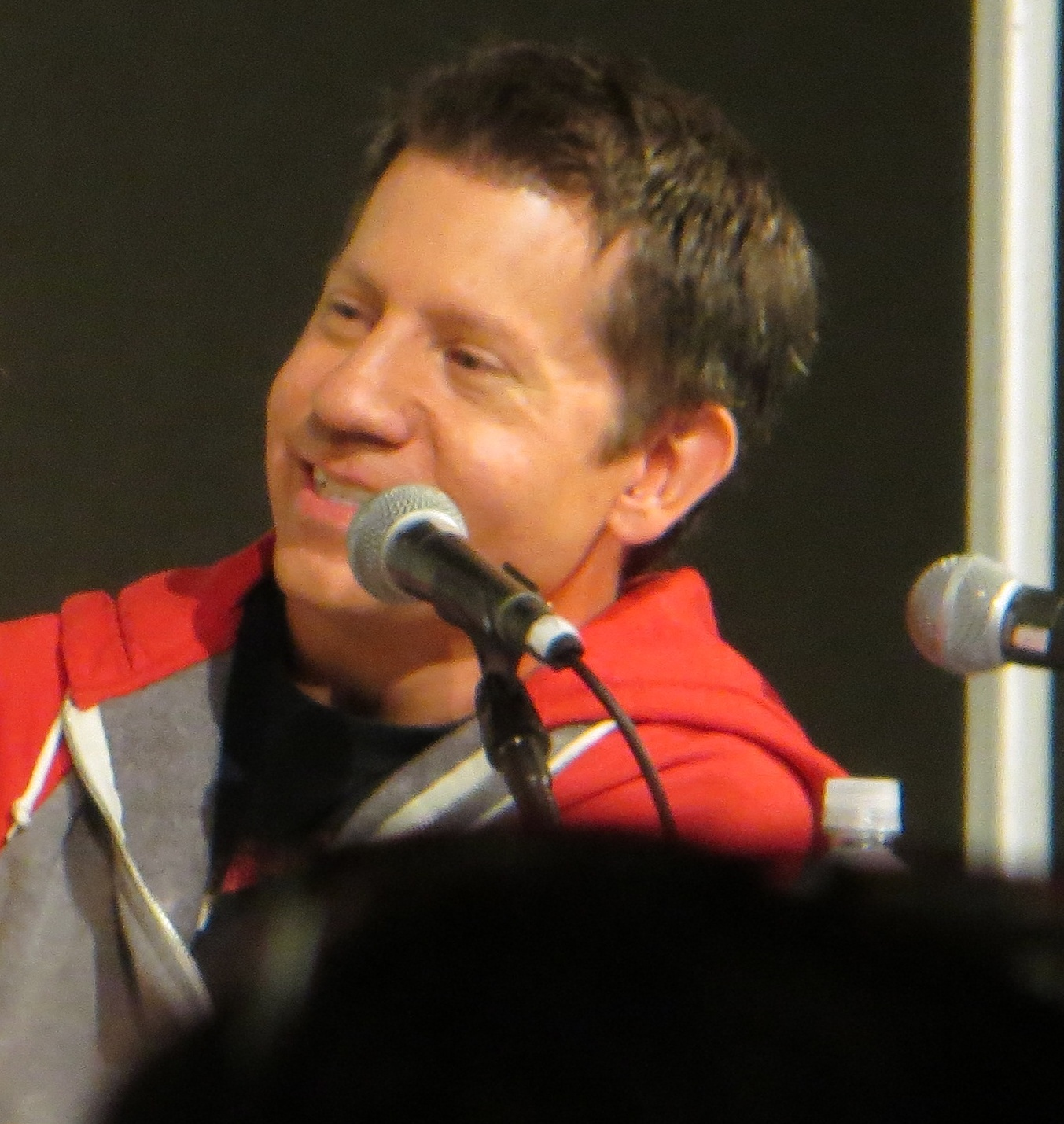
- Jacobson at San Diego Comic-Con in 2015
- Born: January 15, 1971 (age 55); Fort Worth, Texas, U.S.
- Education: NYU Tisch School of the Arts (BFA)
- Occupation: Puppeteer
- Years active: 1994–present
- Spouse: Mary Jacobson
- Children: 2

Eric Jacobson (born January 15, 1971) is an American puppeteer. He is best known for his involvement with the Muppets, performing Miss Piggy, Fozzie Bear, Animal, Sam Eagle, Bert, Grover, Oscar the Grouch, Guy Smiley and the left head of the Two-Headed Monster.

== Early life ==
Eric Jacobson was born on January 15, 1971, in Fort Worth, Texas. He was inspired to enter the field of puppetry after the death of Jim Henson. In 1992, while attending New York University's Tisch School of the Arts, he interned at the Jim Henson Company, working in the archival library. He earned a Bachelor of Fine Arts degree the following year.

== Career ==
Jacobson began his career as a supporting puppeteer on Sesame Street in 1994, occasionally performing the roles of Grover and Bert when Frank Oz wasn't available. Following Oz's retirement from the program, Jacobson became the characters' primary performer. Since 2005, he has performed Guy Smiley, a role previously performed by Henson. Following Caroll Spinney's retirement in 2018, he became the full-time performer of Oscar the Grouch. For his work on the program, he has received Daytime Emmy Award and Primetime Emmy Award nominations in 2011 and 2019, respectively.

Jacobson began performing Miss Piggy in 2001, debuting at the MuppetFest fan convention. The following year, he began performing Fozzie Bear and Animal, debuting in the roles in It's a Very Merry Muppet Christmas Movie. In 2005, he began performing Sam Eagle beginning with The Muppets' Wizard of Oz. The aforementioned characters were also previously performed by Oz, whom he consulted with to accurately maintain characterization and physicality for the characters.

Jacobson has contributed to several other children's television shows, including The Puzzle Place and Jack's Big Music Show. He has performed live puppet theater with Basil Twist, The Puppet Company, The Cosmic Bicycle Theater, and The Swedish Cottage Marionette Theater in Central Park. He performed Harry the Duck on Bear in the Big Blue House and puppeteered Piglet on The Book of Pooh. In 2007, he served as both a puppeteer and writer on Playhouse Disney's Bunnytown.

== Personal life ==
Jacobson is married to Mary Jacobson. The two met during her time as a production assistant on Sesame Street.

== Filmography ==
=== Television ===
| Year(s) | Title | Role | Notes |
|---|---|---|---|
| 1994–present | Sesame Street | Bert (1997–present), Grover (1998–present), Guy Smiley (2005–present), Oscar the Grouch (2015–present) | Puppeteer, Voice |
| 1996–98 | Once Upon a Tree | Billy-Bob the Bobcat | Performer |
| 1998 | The Puzzle Place | Leon MacNeal, Blue Piece Police | Puppeteer (season 3) |
| 1997–2006 | Bear in the Big Blue House | Harry the Duck, Tucker Tutter | Performer |
| 2001 | Between the Lions | Bert | Performer, Episode: "Tweet! Tweet!" |
| 2001–03 | The Book of Pooh | Piglet | Performer (puppetry only) |
| 2002–07 | Play with Me Sesame | Bert, Grover | Performer |
| 2005, 2012 | Jimmy Kimmel Live! | Grover, Fozzie Bear, Animal | Performer; 3 episodes |
| 2005 | The Tony Danza Show | Miss Piggy | Performer; 3 episodes |
| 2005, 2007 | The Late Late Show with Craig Ferguson | Miss Piggy, Fozzie Bear | Performer; 2 episodes |
| 2005–07 | Jack's Big Music Show | Little Bad Wolf, Phil the Coo-Coo Bird | Performer |
| 2005, 2011, 2014 | Live | Miss Piggy | Performer, 3 episodes |
| 2005 | Extreme Makeover: Home Edition | Miss Piggy, Fozzie, Animal | Performer |
| 2006–11 | Pinky Dinky Doo | Additional voices | |
| 2007–08 | Bunnytown | Super Bunny, Green Cave Bunny, Royal Assistant Marvin, Captain Dan, Melvin | Performer (also writer) |
| 2008 | Studio DC: Almost Live | Miss Piggy, Fozzie Bear, Animal, Sam Eagle | Performer |
| 2011 | So Random! | Miss Piggy | Performer, Episode: "Miss Piggy" |
| 2011 | Take Two with Phineas and Ferb | Miss Piggy | Performer, Episode: "Miss Piggy" |
| 2011 | Saturday Night Live | Miss Piggy, Fozzie Bear | Performer, Episode: "Jason Segal/Florence + The Machine" |
| 2011 | The Tonight Show with Jay Leno | Miss Piggy | Performer; 1 episode |
| 2011, 2012 | WWE Raw | Miss Piggy, Fozzie Bear, Animal | Performer, 2 episodes |
| 2011, 2012 | WWE Tribute to the Troops | Miss Piggy, Fozzie Bear, Sam Eagle | Performer; Television special |
| 2013 | Good Luck Charlie | Miss Piggy, Fozzie Bear, Animal | Performer, Episode: "Duncan Dream House" |
| 2013 | Lady Gaga and the Muppets Holiday Spectacular | Miss Piggy, Fozzie Bear, Animal, Sam Eagle | Performer; Television special |
| 2015–16 | The Muppets | Miss Piggy, Fozzie Bear, Animal, Sam Eagle, Marvin Suggs | |
| 2019 | Drop the Mic | Miss Piggy | Performer; 1 episode |
| 2019 | Big City Greens | Dr. Enamel | Voice role, Episode: "Hurty Tooth" Credited as Fozzie Bear; Jacobson credited as Fozzie Bear's "personal handyman" |
| 2020 | The Not-Too-Late Show with Elmo | Bert, Grover, Oscar the Grouch, Two-Headed Monster (left head) | Performer |
| 2020 | Muppets Now | Miss Piggy, Fozzie Bear, Sam Eagle, Animal | Performer; Disney+ series |
| 2020 | The Power of We: A Sesame Street Special | Oscar the Grouch | Performer; Television special |
| 2021 | Muppets Haunted Mansion | Miss Piggy, Fozzie Bear, Sam Eagle, Animal | Performer; Disney+ special |
| 2022 | The Masked Singer | Miss Piggy, Fozzie Bear, Animal | Performer; Episode: "Muppets Night" |
| 2023 | The Muppets Mayhem | Animal | Performer; Disney+ series |
| 2026 | The Muppet Show | Miss Piggy, Fozzie Bear, Sam Eagle, Animal, The Newsman (uncredited) | Performer; Television special |

=== Video games ===
| Year(s) | Title | Role | Notes |
|---|---|---|---|
| 2001 | Sesame Street Sports | Grover | Voice role |
| 2002 | Sesame Street Preschool | Bert | Voice role |
| 2003 | Muppets Party Cruise | Miss Piggy, Fozzie Bear | Voice role |
| 2006 | Bert and Ernie's Imagination Adventure | Bert | Voice role |
| 2011 | Sesame Street: Once Upon a Monster | Grover | Voice role |
| 2011 | Sesame Street: Ready, Set, Grover! | Grover | Voice role |
| 2012 | Kinect Sesame Street TV | Bert, Grover, Guy Smiley | Voice role |
| 2023 | Disney Speedstorm | Miss Piggy, Fozzie Bear | Voice role |

=== Other appearances ===
| Year(s) | Title | Role | Notes |
|---|---|---|---|
| 2003 | Sesame Street 4-D Movie Magic | Grover, Bert | Performer, theme park film |
| 2008–09 | Muppet YouTube Shorts | Miss Piggy, Fozzie Bear, Animal, Sam Eagle | Performer |
| 2010 | The Muppets Kitchen with Cat Cora | Miss Piggy, Fozzie Bear | Performer, web series |
| 2010 | Disney's Honorary VoluntEars Cavalcade | Miss Piggy | Voice, theme park parade |
| 2013–14 | Muppisodes | Miss Piggy, Fozzie Bear | Performer, web shorts |
| 2014 | Nerdy Nummies | Miss Piggy | Performer, Episode: "Muppet Cookies!" |
| 2016–19 | The Muppets Present...Great Moments in American History | Miss Piggy, Fozzie Bear, Sam Eagle | Voice, theme park show |
| 2017 | The Muppets Take the Bowl | Miss Piggy, Fozzie Bear, Animal, Sam Eagle, Newsman | Performer, live show at the Hollywood Bowl, Sept. 8–10 |
| 2018 | The Muppets Take the O2 | Miss Piggy, Fozzie Bear, Animal, Sam Eagle, Newsman | Performer, live show at the O2, Jul. 13–14 |
| 2019 | Muppet Babies Play Date | Miss Piggy (baby), Fozzie Bear (baby), Animal (baby) | Performer (puppetry only), web shorts |
| 2021 | The Muppets' Christmas Caroling Coach | Fozzie Bear, Miss Piggy, Sam Eagle | Voice, theme park show |
| 2025 | "World of Color Happiness!" preshow | Sam Eagle, Animal, Miss Piggy, Fozzie Bear | Performer (prerecorded footage); theme park show |
| 2026 | Life in Looks | Miss Piggy | |
| 2026 | Rock 'n' Roller Coaster Starring The Muppets | Miss Piggy, Fozzie Bear, Animal, Sam Eagle, Newsman | Performer (prerecorded footage); theme park attraction |

== Awards and nominations ==
| Year | Award | Category | Work | Result | Refs |
|---|---|---|---|---|---|
| 2011 | Daytime Emmy Awards | Outstanding Performer in a Children's Series | Sesame Street | Nominated | |
| 2019 | Primetime Emmy Awards | Outstanding Character Voice-Over Performance | When You Wish Upon a Pickle: A Sesame Street Special | Nominated | |
| 2021 | Daytime Emmy Awards | Outstanding Performer in a Preschool Animated Program | The Monster at the End of This Story | Nominated | |
| 2023 | Children's and Family Emmy Awards | Outstanding Puppeteer Performance | The Muppets Mayhem | Nominated | |
| 2023 | Children's and Family Emmy Awards | Outstanding Puppeteer Performance | Sesame Street | Nominated | |
| 2026 | Primetime Emmy Awards | Outstanding Variety Special (Pre-Recorded) | The Muppet Show | Won | |

| Preceded by Frank Oz | Performer of Bert; 1997 – present | Succeeded by None |
| Preceded by Frank Oz | Performer of Grover; 1998 – present | Succeeded by None |
| Preceded by Frank Oz | Performer of Miss Piggy; 2001 – present | Succeeded by None |
| Preceded by Frank Oz | Performer of Fozzie Bear; 2002 – present | Succeeded by None |
| Preceded by Frank Oz | Performer of Animal; 2002 – present | Succeeded by None |
| Preceded by Kevin Clash | Performer of Sam Eagle; 2005 – present | Succeeded by None |
| Preceded by Don Reardon | Performer of Guy Smiley; 2005 – present | Succeeded by None |
| Preceded by Frank Oz | Performer of Marvin Suggs; 2011 – present | Succeeded by None |
| Preceded by Joey Mazzarino | Performer of Two-Headed Monster (left head); 2016 – present | Succeeded by None |
| Preceded by Caroll Spinney | Performer of Oscar the Grouch; 2015 – present | Succeeded by None |
| Preceded by Steve Whitmire | Performer of The Muppet Newsman; 2017 – present | Succeeded by None |
| Preceded by Matt Vogel | Performer of Harvey Kneeslapper; 2019 – present | Succeeded by None |
