= Statler and Waldorf =

Muppet characters

- The Muppets characters
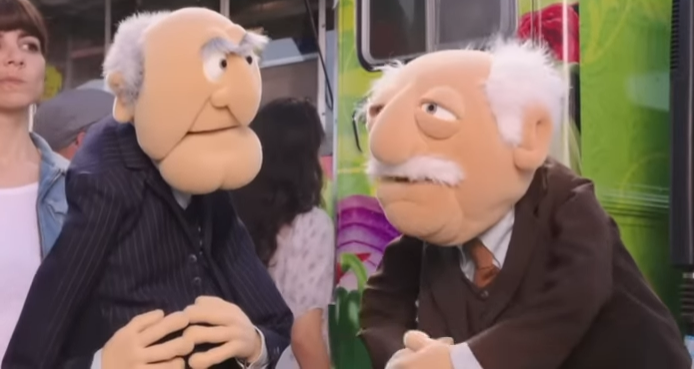
- Statler (left) and Waldorf (right)
- First appearance: The Muppet Show: Sex and Violence (1975)
- Created by: Jim Henson; Bonnie Erickson
- Performed by: Statler: Richard Hunt (1976–1992); Jerry Nelson (1975, 1992–2003); Steve Whitmire (2002–2016); Peter Linz (2017–present); Waldorf: Jim Henson (1975–1990); Dave Goelz (1992–present)

In-universe information
- Aliases: Waldorf: P. Fenton Cosgrove, Uncle Waldorf, Robert Marley, Wally-D, Willy R Statler: Uncle Statler, Jacob Marley, StatCat, Alan D
- Species: Muppet humans
- Gender: Males
- Occupation: Hecklers
- Spouses: Waldorf: Astoria (ex-wife); Statler: Unnamed wife
- Nationality: American

Statler and Waldorf are a pair of Muppet characters from the sketch comedy television series The Muppet Show, best known for their overly negative opinions and their tendency to heckle people. The two elderly men first appeared in The Muppet Show: Sex and Violence in 1975, where they were portrayed as older men pondering the ends of their golden years. It wasn't until one year later on The Muppet Show that they consistently jeered the entirety of the cast and their performances from their box seats.

Created by Jim Henson, the characters have been performed by numerous puppeteers, including Henson, in a variety of films and television productions within the Muppet franchise. Statler and Waldorf are named after two landmark New York City hotels, the Statler Hilton and the Waldorf-Astoria (in turn named after Ellsworth Milton Statler and the hometown of the Astor family).

== Characters ==
The characters are known for their heckling. In The Muppet Show, the two are always criticizing Fozzie Bear's humor, except for one occasion when Fozzie heckles them back. In contrast, they find themselves hilarious and burst into laughter at their own comments. It is later revealed in the A Muppet Family Christmas special that the two hecklers are friends with Fozzie's mother, Emily Bear. Despite constantly complaining about the show and how terrible some acts are, they always return for the following week and occupy their usual box seats, with their theatre box being located on the right wall. Their reasons for doing so are a mystery even to them, according to one version of the Muppet Show theme (Waldorf: "Why do we always come here?" / Statler: "I guess we'll never know").

They also often break the fourth wall. Author Ben Underwood remarked on how the characters generally "blur the boundary between performer and audience", as they are "concurrently audience members and performers". Underwood points to a second season incident in which the characters see themselves watching the Muppets, with Statler skeptical, saying "No one would watch junk like that".

== History ==
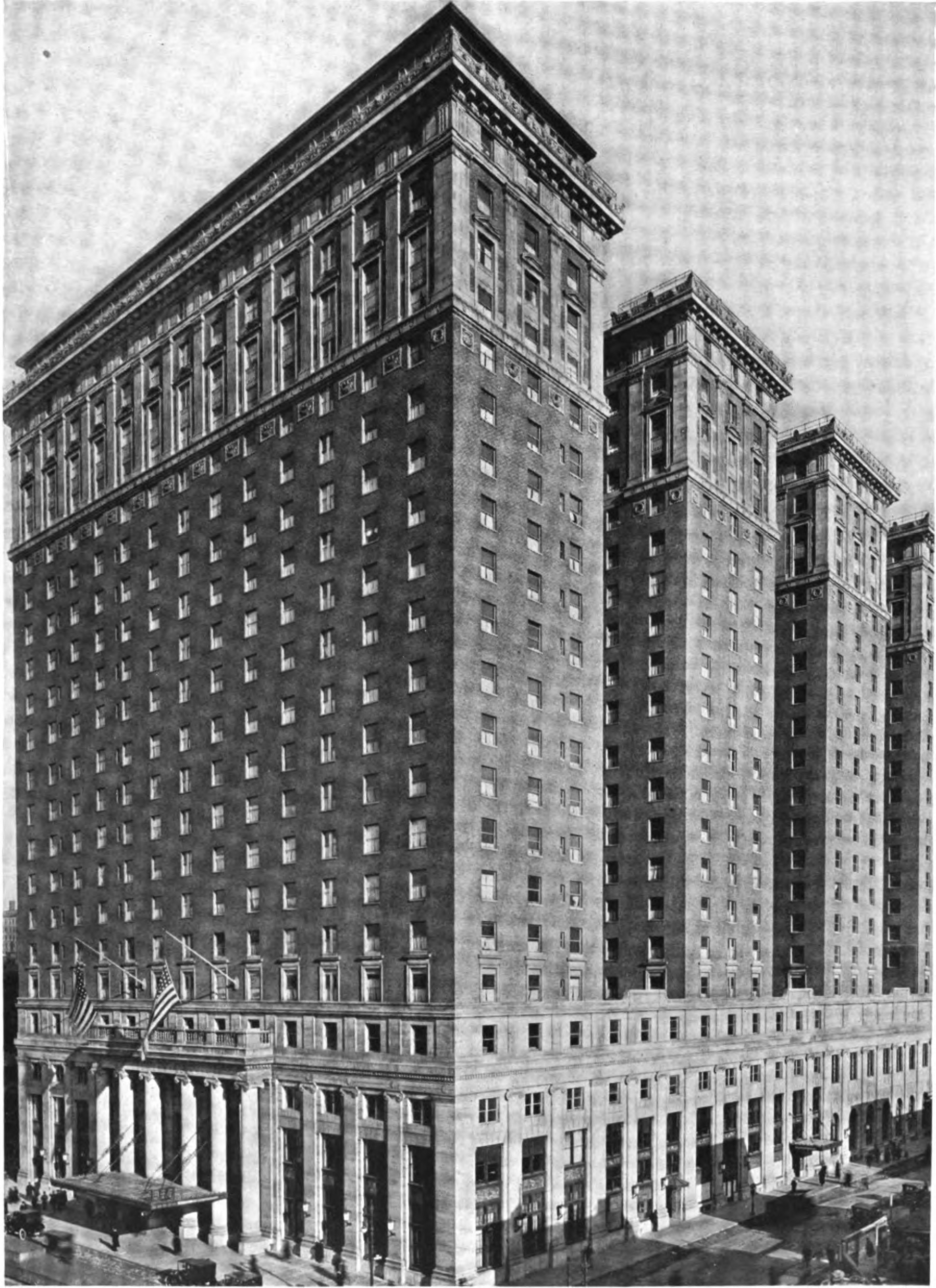
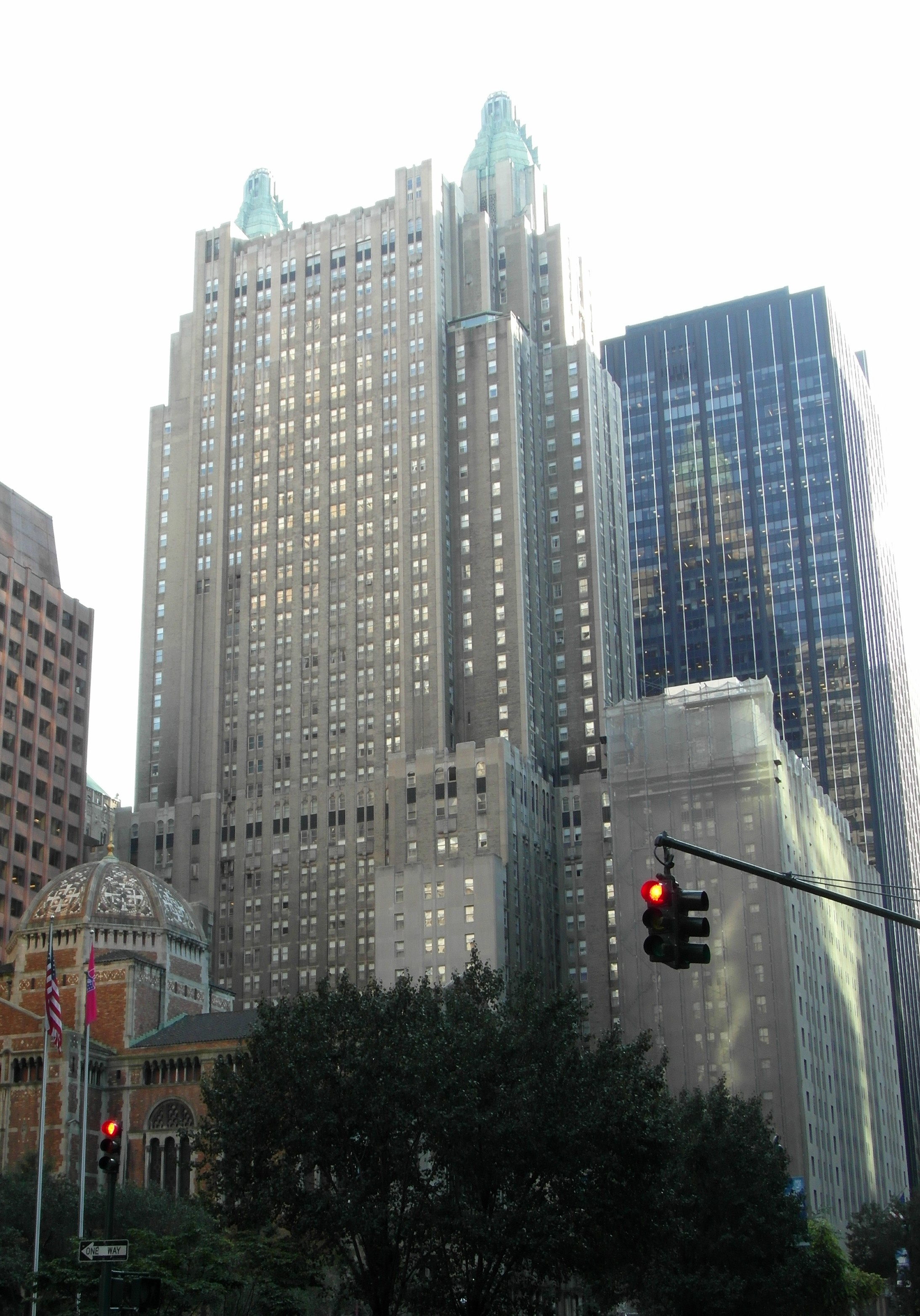
New York's Statler Hilton and Waldorf-Astoria, from which Statler and Waldorf's names are derived

The puppets were designed by Bonnie Erickson. They were named after two historic New York City hotels, the Statler Hilton and the Waldorf-Astoria.

In "Sex and Violence", the pilot episode of The Muppet Show, Statler and Waldorf were performed by Jerry Nelson and Jim Henson, respectively. Nelson was unavailable for the first few weeks of production on The Muppet Show. As a result, Richard Hunt took on the role of Statler. Hunt and Henson would continue to perform the two characters until Henson's death in 1990 and Hunt's death in 1992. To portray the characters, Hunt and Henson shared very close space, often for hours at a time.

Beginning with The Muppet Christmas Carol (1992), Statler and Waldorf were performed by Jerry Nelson and Dave Goelz, respectively. When Jerry Nelson left the Muppets, citing health reasons, Muppeteer Steve Whitmire took over as Statler. The two were occasionally performed by Drew Massey (Statler) and Victor Yerrid (Waldorf) in 2005 and 2006, most notably in the web series Statler and Waldorf: From the Balcony. Kevin Clash filled in for Goelz as Waldorf in a few episodes of Muppets Tonight.

In October 2016, Whitmire was dismissed by The Muppets Studio, after long-running disputes with other staff members and the Henson family. Peter Linz replaced Whitmire as the performer of Statler.

== Appearances ==
Statler and Waldorf also appeared (as adults) in the Saturday morning animated television series Muppet Babies. Both characters were voiced by Dave Coulier.

In The Muppet Christmas Carol, they played the ghosts of Jacob and Robert Marley. Whereas the novel A Christmas Carol features only a Jacob Marley, creating a Robert allowed for including the two Muppets, and possibly also references Bob Marley. When Ebenezer Scrooge, played by Michael Caine, accuses them of always criticizing him, they reply "We were always heckling you." In Muppet Treasure Island, they were the figureheads of the Hispaniola. Statler complains about being stuck on the front of the ship, to which Waldorf replies it is better than being in the audience.

In the 1996 series Muppets Tonight, based on a television rather than theatre show, Statler and Waldorf were shown watching the show at an assisted living facility, still making disparaging remarks. The duo are featured characters at Disney's Muppet*Vision 3D at Disney's Hollywood Studios as audio-animatronic Muppets helping Bean Bunny escape the theater and, of course, heckling the show. After the closure of that attraction, they were moved to the drop off queue of Rock 'n' Roller Coaster, continuing to provide commentary as guests disembark the ride. They also make a cameo appearance in Pixar's 2008 short film Presto, where they can be seen in their theater box.

The Muppet Newsflash: A Jim Henson News Blog announced on September 17, 2009, that Statler and Waldorf would release a book titled From the Balcony in 2010. However, the book was never released.

Statler and Waldorf appear in featured roles in The Muppets film. They are shown in Kermit's old office where they inform evil oil baron Tex Richman that the only thing that could stop his purchase of The Muppet Theater would be Kermit raising $10 million. They appear during one scene of the 2014 sequel Muppets Most Wanted. When the Muppets arrive in Berlin to perform at a run-down cabaret theater, marked by a sign reading "Die Muppets" ("The Muppets" in German), the two joke as to whether this is an early review or a suggestion. This scene is presented in the "Statler and Waldorf Cut" of the film in its home video release.

The two also appear as audience members in The Muppets TV series. The episode "Pig Out" features a B-plot focusing on Statler without Waldorf. They also appear on Muppets Now.

=== From the Balcony ===
Statler and Waldorf: From the Balcony is a multi-award-winning web show which ran biweekly on Movies.com from June 2005 until September 2006. The series spawned more than 35 episodes and featured many Muppet characters, both well-known classics and newly created characters. The two elderly curmudgeons would discuss upcoming films, watch the latest movie trailers and share the week's "balconism" from their theater box.

=== Guest appearances ===
- Both made an appearance in Marvel Team-Up #74. In this issue, Spider-Man teams up with the cast of Saturday Night Live to battle the Silver Samurai. Statler and Waldorf appear in typical style as hecklers on a balcony.
- Both made an appearance in the 2012 final chapter of Major League Chew, set in the Image Universe.
- They appear at the end of Weezer's video for the song "'Keep Fishin'". They comment that the performance was not half bad, before adding that it was all bad.
- On the song "The Black Hole" by HORSE the band, the track ends with Statler and Waldorf celebrating the song and then talking themselves into decrying it as "terrible".
- On September 18, 2009, Statler and Waldorf were shown in a routine on The Tonight Show with Conan O'Brien called "Statler and Waldorf Heckle Obama", consisting of a video recording of President Barack Obama at a health care rally, with old Muppet Show clips of Statler and Waldorf interspersed within it.
- To promote The Muppets, they also appeared with several other Muppets on the 2011 Halloween episode of WWE Raw, with the duo offering their usual commentary from a skybox.
- The pair make occasional cameos in Family Guy, such as heckling Lost after Peter builds a balcony in his living room ("Petergeist") or a cutaway where Statler is shown without Waldorf and realises he enjoys the show without "the other guy" there to egg him on ("Jerome is the New Black").
- The pair also appeared "via satellite" as BFCA critics at the 2012 Critics' Choice Movie Awards on January 12, 2012.
- Statler and Waldorf appeared several times from the balcony to critique the performers at The Secret Policeman's Ball 2012 at Radio City Music Hall in New York City on March 4, 2012.
- Statler and Waldorf also appeared at The Game Awards 2024 to heckle the presenter, Geoff Keighley, during his announcement speech.

== Reception ==
In The Guardian, Hadley Freeman wrote "Not even celebrity guest Milton Berle could compete with their sharp banter. My heroes". In 2014, Esquire's Nick Schager named them one of The 10 Most Entertaining Fictional Critics, writing "the funniest Muppets characters have always been Statler and Waldorf". In 2015, The Huffington Post identified Statler and Waldorf as popular Muppets, and said to the fans who love them above others, "You know the best way to cope with life's difficulties is by laughing at someone else's expense".

Commentators sometimes make comparisons between people and Statler and Waldorf in attention to, or preoccupation with, details, "loud" opinion, or "cantankerous" personality. In 2012, Der Spiegel described the United Kingdom as "at best spectators in the gallery, like Statler and Waldorf", within Europe, drawing the ire of British media.

== Bibliography ==
- Fisher, Maryanne; Cox, Anthony (2009). "Adaptation and Performance". Kermit Culture: Critical Perspectives on Jim Henson's Muppets. Jefferson, North Carolina and London: McFarland. ISBN 978-0786453757.
- Glavin, John, ed. (2017). Dickens Adapted. Routledge. ISBN 978-1351944564 – via Google Books.
- Jones, Brian Jay (2013). Jim Henson: The Biography. Random House Publishing Group. ISBN 978-0345526137 – via Google Books.
- Kreider, Evan (2015). "Muppets and Mimesis". Jim Henson and Philosophy: Imagination and the Magic of Mayhem. Rowman & Littlefield. ISBN 978-1442246652.
- Shemin, Craig (2014). Disney's The Muppets Character Encyclopedia. New York: DK Publishing. ISBN 9781465417480.
- Terrace, Vincent (2016). Internet Comedy Television Series, 1997–2015. McFarland. ISBN 978-1476623931.
- Underwood, Ben (2009). "How to Become a Muppet". Kermit Culture: Critical Perspectives on Jim Henson's Muppets. Jefferson, North Carolina and London: McFarland. ISBN 978-0786453757.
- Yousufi, Mushtaq Ahmed (2015). "Introduction". Mirages of the Mind. New Directions Publishing. ISBN 978-0811224147.
