= The Muppets Movie Adventures =

2014 video game

- Cover art for the European version
- Developer: Virtual Toys
- Publisher: Sony Computer Entertainment
- Composer: Victor David Peral
- Engine: Unity
- Platform: PlayStation Vita
- Release: PAL: 5 November 2014; NA: 1 September 2015
- Genre: Platform
- Mode: Single-player

The Muppets Movie Adventures is a 2014 platform video game developed by Virtual Toys and published by Sony Computer Entertainment for the PlayStation Vita. The title is based on the films The Muppets and Muppets Most Wanted. The game centres around the production of a movie, with characters from The Muppets era serving as the characters in the respective film. The Muppets Movie Adventures was released in PAL territories on 5 November 2014, with physical copies arriving a short time later. The North American version arrived a year later. Upon launch, the title received mixed to negative reviews.

The game is narrated by Cheryl Henson, daughter of The Muppets era creator Jim Henson and the current president of the Jim Henson Foundation.

== Gameplay ==
The Muppets Movie Adventures is a 2-dimensional side-scrolling platform game in which players traverse landscapes based on famous films, jumping across obstacles and exploring the terrain. Enemies appear in each chapter, who have the ability to swing or throw projectiles at the player (these vary depending on the stage). If hit, the player loses half of a heart; with three hearts being available, the gamer may receive a maximum of five hits before restarting from a nearby checkpoint. Hearts are scattered throughout the level. When collected, the life bar is restored to maximum capacity. Controlled characters also house weapons however, which allows the player to attack and defeat enemies. Mini-games in the style of dots and boxes are also scattered throughout levels. These puzzles must be solved in order for the player to progress through the stage.

Each stage features a different player character and is centered around a particular movie genre (for example, level three is a western film), and features a unique story not related to other levels. At the end of each stage is a boss battle. Scattered throughout each level are collectibles as well.

== Stages/Synopsis ==
There are a total of five stages in The Muppets Movie Adventures. Each stage is locked (with the exception of the first one) until the level before it is completed.

Stage One: Greenlegs: The Swashbuckling Pirate Frog
Based on: Original Story?
Theme: Pirate

The players control Kermit the Frog playing the role of "Captain Greenlegs" who is the captain of the pirate ship called the Rapid Mosquito. Greenlegs is described as a pirate Robin Hood, as he donates portions of his loot to those in need. This action has garnered the captain considered popularity with the public, including "being voted pirate of the year the last ten years by Pirate Monthly Magazine". However, the tyrannical Guard Chief Sweetums is jealous of Greenlegs, feeling he should be the hero of the citizens. Guard Chief Sweetums captures Greenelegs, tying him over a pool of sharks to eliminate the pirate. However, Greenlegs escapes. The player then assumes control, with the task of traversing though the local town on route to your ship, in order to make a safe getaway. Even when Captain Greenlegs defeats Guard Chief Sweetums, he encounters him again where it is stated that he is his twin brother due to this being a low-budget movie and that they couldn't afford another actor. Following the defeat of Guard Chief Sweetums and his twin brother, Captain Greenlegs returns to the Rapid Mosquito and sets sail for bold new adventures.

Stage Two: The Wizard of the Green Earth
Based on: The Wizard of Oz (1939)
Theme: Fantasy

The players control Miss Piggy, who plays the role of "Princess Miss Piggy". Piggy reigns over the paradise-like land of Green Earth which is described as a land of "fantasy, magic and powerful warriors". Despite this beauty, "Evil Wizard Uncle Deadly" has been barred from Green Earth ever since he proposed to transform a portion of Green Earth into a parking garage with narrow spaces, overpriced rates, and gas-guzzling cars that belch smoke and make annoying screeching sounds with their brakes. Princess Miss Piggy demanded that Green Earth would remain pure. In order to entice Miss Piggy to allow construction, Evil Wizard Uncle Deadly has his minions bring gifts to the princess. When this fails, Evil Wizard Uncle Deadly sends his chicken henchmen to kidnap the famed court musician "Kermit the Court Musician Frog" who Princess Miss Piggy likes. The level revolves entirely around Miss Piggy climbing the Black Tower in order to save Kermit and stop Evil Wixard Uncle Deadly. After fighting her way past the army of chickens and orcs (portrayed by blue versions of Timmy Monster), Princess Miss Piggy confronts Evil Wizard Uncle Deadly and defeats him by deflecting the green energy balls back towards him. Princess Miss Piggy frees Kermit the Court Musician Frog and they live happily ever after.

Gameplay from The Good, the Bad and the Animal stage

Stage Three: The Good, the Bad and the Animal
Based on: The Good, the Bad and the Ugly (1966)
Theme: Western

The players control Animal (dressed identically as the Man with No Name), a retired sheriff who's forced back into action after an incident at a local town named Frogstone. The town residence have been longing for tomato sauce to add onto their pasta which is a traditional meal. One day, sauce is discovered to be under the town (similar in vain to when oil is struck) by a local dog. Seeing an opportunity for profit, Constantine (dressed in a fashion similar to Angel Eyes), a pasta tycoon, attempts to steal the sauce with the help of his henchrats. This is when Animal comes in upon being informed by a local woman (portrayed by Janice). Throughout the level, Animal progresses through both towns and moving trains leading to Animal's meatball shootout with Constantine. Upon defeating Constantine, Sheriff Animal throws Constantine in jail where he will learn the error of his ways.

Stage Four: The Night of the Walking Veggies
Based on: Night of the Living Dead (1968)
Theme: Horror

The players control Gonzo as Dr. Von Gonzo, the legendary hero of paranormality. With a local town called Marshtown facing a drought, Dr. Bunsen Honeydew builds a machine in his castle which is intended to grow the vegetables itself where he plans to make them grow strong and healthy. However, the absence of Honeydew's helpful and hapless assistant Beaker, who is away on vacation, causes an error in the machine which now makes the vegetables become Vampire Veggies (portrayed by the Singing Food) where its energies affects the crops. Dr. Honeydew tries to stop the machine, but gets injured in the process. When the Vampire Veggies go on a rampage in Marshtown, Dr. Von Gonzo is called in by Camilla the Chicken to shut down the machine and save the town. Throughout the stage, the player must guide Dr. Von Gonzo through the castle in which Dr. Honeydew lives while fighting Vampire Veggies in an effort to turn off the creation. After Dr. Von Gonzo shuts down the machine, Marshtown is saved just as Beaker returns from his vacation to join in on the celebration.

Stage Five: The Koozebane Menace
Based on: Star Wars: Episode I – The Phantom Menace (1999) (title), Star Trek series (1966–) (level)
Theme: Science fiction

The players control Kermit as Commander Kirmit in a role similar to Captain Kirk. Traveling in his spacecraft alongside First Mate Miss Piggy in Far Off Sector 355 in the outer reaches of outer space, Commander Kermit are lost in a remote part of the galaxy while exploring deep space. They then receive a distress signal from aliens asking for assistance and are hit by a meteorite and crash land on the nearby planet Koozebane. Commander Kermit wakes up to find Miss Piggy missing, but notices multiple footprints leading away from the ship. Having concluded his passenger was taken, Commander Kermit sets out to find Miss Piggy while also collecting parts to repair his ship's broken generator. Commander Kermit possesses the ability to boost and hover with his space boots in this mission, while also using a bubble gun similar in appearance and execution to the Phasers from Star Trek to fend off the native fauna. The end villain is revealed to be a giant-sized Pepe the King Prawn who is madly in love with First Mate Miss Piggy and has since become the king of Koozebane following a cheap vacation. After using his molecular reducer to reduce Pepe back to his original size making the planet Koozebane not a menace, Commander Kermit rescues First Mate Piggy and they resume their mission to explore the galaxy and look for good places to eat.

Once all the stages are done, the Muppets get together for a group photo at the world premiere of their films.

== Development ==
The game was announced on August 8, 2014, on Play France, a French website dedicated to PlayStation video game systems. A series of screenshots accompanied the announcement, depicting scenes from the first three stages. The game was released on the PlayStation Store in Australia and Europe a few months later on November 5, 2014. Physical copies would follow later on November 7 in Europe. The game was released in Spain on November 11. Australia's physicals came on November 14. The game would not be released in North America for nearly a year until it launched as a download-only title on September 1, 2015. Virtual Toys and Sony would later collaborate on two more licensed PlayStation Vita exclusive titles aimed at children: Looney Tunes Galactic Sports and Phineas and Ferb: Day of Doofenshmirtz. Based on the Looney Tunes and Phineas and Ferb franchises, the games were released in 2015.

== Reception ==
Reception

Aggregate score
Aggregator	Score
Metacritic	48/100

The Muppets Movie Adventures received mixed to negative reviews upon release. The title currently holds a score of 48 on review aggregator Metacritic, based on 12 reviews.

The Vita Lounge's Brad Gruetzmacher, reviewing for both the website and magazine held mixed feelings towards the game. Gruetzmacher praised the animated cutscenes and introductions given by the director at the start of each stage, appreciating their humor directed at all ages. He felt mixed feelings towards the controls, applauding the simplicity of the two-button system (one for jumping, another for attacking) whilst taking issue with the touch screen controls, saying they were "shoe-horned" in. Gruetzmacher also criticized the game for a lack of replay value, short length and easy difficulty. He ultimately awarded the title 2.8/5 stars, giving high marks to the execution but scored the lasting appeal low.
