= Puppet Heap =

Puppet design, fabrication and production company

Puppet Heap, LLC
- Industry: Puppetry
- Founded: 2004; 22 years ago
- Founder: Paul Andrejco
- Headquarters: Bloomfield, New Jersey, United States

Puppet Heap, LLC is a puppet design, fabrication and production company currently based in Bloomfield, New Jersey. The company was founded by artist and designer Paul Andrejco, who previously worked for The Jim Henson Company from 1992 to 2001 and designed the characters for Bear in the Big Blue House that aired on the Disney Channel. In 2004, Andrejco opened Puppet Heap at its former location in Hoboken, New Jersey. The company's studio has a workshop, wood shop, casting facilities, and a production and photography studio.

Puppet Heap has worked on multiple productions, including several series of short films based on original characters. From 2011, Heap produced a commercial line of puppets based on original characters, Puppet Heap Playthings, cited as the best new toy of 2011 in the Washington Post. Since 2006, Puppet Heap has been under contract with The Walt Disney Company, entrusted with the care, maintenance, and creative support of the Muppet characters for its Muppets Studio division, including the character of Walter for The Muppets.
