= Give a Day, Get a Disney Day =

Give a Day, Get a Disney Day was a promotion created by The Walt Disney Company to increase attendance at its theme parks and promote volunteerism across North America. The company partnered with American charitable and non-profit organizations to provide volunteer opportunities; individuals who volunteered with associated charities and non-profits received a voucher for one free admission to a Walt Disney World Resort or Disneyland Resort theme park. The promotion had been scheduled to run from January 1, 2010, through December 15, 2010, but ended early, as the full allotment of one million free days were committed by early March.

Jim Henson's Muppets, owned by Disney since 2004, were used for the promotion.

== Campaign ==
Announced on September 29, 2009 by chairman of Disney Parks & Resorts Thomas Staggs, with help from The Muppets, the Give a Day, Get a Disney Day promotion was an initiative in affiliation with the Hands-On volunteer network that worked to inspire over one million people to volunteer in 2010. Immediately following the What Will You Celebrate? campaign from earlier that year, Give a day, Get a Disney Day aimed to celebrate those who make a difference in their communities by rewarding them with free entrance to either the Walt Disney World or the Disneyland resort. This promotion was open to those living in the United States, Canada, and Puerto Rico with an age requirement of eighteen for initial sign up. Unlike the What Will You Celebrate? campaign, which awarded free admission to someone on their birthday, this promotion allowed a family – up to eight members – to get into the park together; as long as they had all completed the needed volunteer service day after January 1, 2010.

Those interested were advised to log onto the appropriate Disney Parks website from which they would click a sign up link that would redirect them to the Hands-On network campaign page. From there the participants could search for volunteer opportunities near them that worked in conjunction with the campaign; ranging from helping at a food bank to setting up charity events. After signing up their entire party, the participants then waited until their scheduled volunteer date, completed the day of service, and waited for the service day to be verified by the Hands-on Network system. Once verified, the participants could then return to the Disney parks website, through which they would apply for the free admission voucher, provide a date on which they expected to use the voucher along with the resort they would attend – participants were not held to a specific date as the tickets were valid until December 15, 2010 but this step was done more as a way for Disney’s own record – sending the request off within a maximum waiting period of two weeks, to hear back from Disney. After the request was filtered through Disney's system, and verified, the participants would receive an email from Disney containing their printable admission vouchers.

If the participant already had an annual pass, was an active cast member, or for whatever reason could not use a free admission ticket, they were then given the choice of a secondary reward: usually either a fast pass card that work on certain attractions, an Ear-hat figurine with exclusive trading pins, or the opportunity to donate their ticket to a non-profit organization of their choice. The ticket could not be transferred into someone else's name but could be applied to the cost of an annual pass or a multi-day ticket – going into effect on the day the ticket was purchased.

== Promotional materials ==
Alongside the official campaign announcement in September 2009, Disney's own organization of volunteer cast members, known as VoluntEARS, joined over 1,000 local community efforts in cities around North America to raise awareness for the announcement. This effort was also supported by thousands of volunteers from Southwest Airlines, who in turn provided transportation for a twenty-city tour of the message. During this tour, Disney was in collaboration with Pro Motion! experiential marketing Organized guerrilla events all over North America through local events, concerts, and Disney’s Jammitors pop-up performances in front of iconic landmarks across the continent in an attempt to raise campaign awareness.

Although this campaign tied together Public Relations, Digital Media, as well as radio and television, the stars of the promotion were The Muppets. They helped introduce the campaign alongside Thomas Staggs and completed a series of talk-show interviews as part of a media week, and were also the main faces for much of the campaign's other promotional materials. Premiering in September 2009, a series of TV and radio commercial spots starring The Muppets began airing. These commercials usually featured The Muppets working on a volunteer project and often featured cameos from ABC and Disney Channel actors. The Muppets made appearances on Extreme Makeover: Home Edition, among other Disney network shows, promoting the campaign.

Aside from their TV and radio spots, The Muppets were also featured in print and digital advertisement. Multiple magazine spreads depicted The Muppets volunteering, usually building a house, as a turn of the page revealed them enjoying a day at the parks. The Muppets were also featured in digital campaigns spanning across all Disney parks websites and Facebook. Participants visiting the Disney parks website would also see the Muppets and be given the option to customize the homepage, where the Muppets would greet the users by name and provide them with different scenarios in which they would seemingly destroy the site; only to have the users be able to repair the site. Then they provide information on how they could help in their community to receive a free Disney park ticket. This was accompanied by online video skits which showed The Muppets volunteering as well as an interactive campaign tour tracker which users could use to see where the Jammitors or other campaign supported events would be nearest them. This digital campaign also carried over into Facebook, on which those who had participated in the campaign or those who supported its efforts could display badges on their profile featuring a specific Muppet character and a campaign slogan.

The campaign was also featured in all of the North American Disney parks. Park guests had the opportunity to purchase campaign pins, buttons, and clothing that sported images of the Muppets in construction clothing featuring campaign slogans. Both resorts also presented a daily “Honorary VoluntEARS Cavalcade” which featured Miss Piggy, Kermit the frog, and Sweetums upon an "under-construction" parade float, surrounded by any campaign participants that were present in the park that day.

== Conclusion and revival ==
On March 9, 2010 the Give a Day, Get a Disney Day campaign officially ended with a press release from Disney sixty-seven days after it had initially begun. Disney’s goal to inspire one million people to volunteer had been met much quicker than they had anticipated, causing the early shutdown of the campaign; which had been scheduled to span most of the year. Although the promotion ended two months after its initiation, the tickets given out to participants were valid until December 15, 2010, aside from specific blackout dates scattered throughout the year. The campaign itself won the 2010 Pro Motion award for the best campaign. While this campaign was similar to its predecessor What Will You Celebrate?, it offered more such as complimentary admission to participants, the ability of volunteers to get tickets for up to eight people to make a vacation out of the free day; especially to those who visited Walt Disney World in Orlando as many of its visitors tend to come out of state. Creating traffic and revenue for both resorts.

Nine years since its original debut, on February 5, 2019 Hong Kong Disneyland announced a revival of the campaign. Offering the same exchange of free admission for volunteerism within the surrounding community, except, this updated version requires a minimum of ten separate hours of community service to receive the complimentary ticket.
