= Samabhavana Society =

- Founded: 2000
- Type: Registered Non Profit Community based Organization (NGCBO)
- Location: Mumbai
- Region served: India
- Key people: Jasmir Thakur
- Website: http://www.samabhavanasociety.org/

Samabhavana Society is an ISO 9001:2008 certified non-profit organisation in India that serves the society primarily in the areas of Child Protection, Gender, Sexuality & Human rights across India. The NGO is actively involved in mapping of NGOs with good track record and implementation of CSR projects in India.

== History ==
Samabhavana started informally in 1999 and later got registered in 2000. When the NGO started out, it aimed to empower disadvantaged and poor Male Sex Workers, Masseurs and Men who have Sex with Men (MSM) through various awareness programmes related to STI, HIV/AIDS, through behaviour change. Over the years, the ngo has expanded to support various causes with a focus on gaining a dignified living for the benefactors of its various projects.

In 2012, a photo exhibition of Male Masseurs helped by Samabhavana was held in London by photo journalist Charles Fox. Samabhavana had helped around 160 of the male masseurs who were stuck in sex trade due to abject poverty, to find other jobs such as plumbing, electrical works etc.

== Projects ==
Some of the major projects at Samabhavana are SMILE, HAI and PRISM.

In 2010, ILS Law College in Pune joined hands with NGO Samabhavana Society to start a certificate course covering the rights of gays, transgender people, sex workers and surrogate mothers, among others.

Samabhavana also offers vocational training to male prostitutes with the support of Love146, an organization that advocates for exploited children.

== Corporate Social Responsibility(CSR) ==
Corporates partner with Samabhavana to support various causes through their CSR projects.

'Cuppa dile se' is project in alignment with the National Policy for Persons with Disabilities to promote education and employment-enhancing opportunities for women, children, elderly and the disabled. Corporates who partnered for this project hired tea vendors who are deaf and mute as part of their livelihood enhancement initiatives under CSR.

SMILE (Students Mastering Important Life skills Education) program is a project that educates students with disabilities from Grade-I to Grade 10 on areas of child protection, gender equality, responsible behavior, financial inclusion and physiology with additional classes on safe sex, STDs and HIV/AIDs. Anatomy classes are taken for Grade-9 and Grade-10.

Healthy Adolescent Initiative (HAI) program helps adolescents and teachers with regular health check-ups and nutritional advice.

Walt Disney India joined hands with Samabhavana to paint the pediatric wards at Wadia Children's Hospital for their Voluntears program.

== Global Conference on CSR ==
The NGO holds a Global Conference on Corporate Social Responsibility inviting eminent personalities to discuss corporate and governmental intervention on topics of community welfare.

== Accreditation ==
Samabhavana Society has multiple accreditation which includes ISO 9001:2008, CAF America & National Hub for CSR-TISS Certified organization.

== Partners ==
Hivos, an international organization partnered with Samabhavana to support the cause of emancipation of LGBT & Human Rights.
