= Muppets Most Wanted =

- Theatrical release poster
- Directed by: James Bobin
- Written by: James Bobin; Nicholas Stoller
- Based on: Disney's Muppet characters and properties
- Produced by: David Hoberman; Todd Lieberman
- Starring: Ricky Gervais; Ty Burrell; Tina Fey
- Cinematography: Don Burgess
- Edited by: James Thomas
- Music by: Christophe Beck
- Production companies: Walt Disney Pictures; Mandeville Films
- Distributed by: Walt Disney Studios Motion Pictures
- Release dates: March 11, 2014 (El Capitan Theatre); March 21, 2014 (United States)
- Running time: 107 minutes (original cut); 119 minutes (extended edition)
- Country: United States
- Language: English
- Budget: $50 million
- Box office: $80.4 million

Muppets Most Wanted is a 2014 American musical crime comedy film, directed by James Bobin, and written by Bobin and Nicholas Stoller. It is a sequel to The Muppets (2011) and the eighth theatrical film featuring the Muppets. The film stars Ricky Gervais, Ty Burrell and Tina Fey, alongside Muppet performers Steve Whitmire, Eric Jacobson, Dave Goelz, Bill Barretta, David Rudman, Matt Vogel and Peter Linz. In the film, the Muppets become involved in an international crime caper while on a world tour in Europe.

The majority of the production team behind The Muppets (2011) returned for Muppets Most Wanted, including Bobin and Stoller. Bret McKenzie and Christophe Beck also returned to compose the film's songs and musical score respectively. Principal photography commenced in January 2013 at Pinewood Studios in England. It was produced by Walt Disney Pictures and Mandeville Films.

Muppets Most Wanted had its world premiere at the El Capitan Theatre in Los Angeles on March 11, 2014, and was released theatrically in North America on March 21, by Walt Disney Studios Motion Pictures. The film made less than its predecessor, grossing $80 million against a budget of $50 million. It received generally positive reviews from critics who praised its humor and soundtrack.

== Plot ==
Following their last adventure, the Muppets are unsure of their next move. Their new tour manager, Dominic Badguy, suggests a world tour. Unknown to them, Dominic is secretly working for Constantine, the world's number one criminal who bears a striking resemblance to Kermit the Frog. After escaping from a Siberian Gulag, Constantine contacts his subordinate Dominic, and they hatch a plan to use the Muppets' tour as a cover for a series of heists. During the tour's first stop in Berlin, a stressed Kermit is ambushed by Constantine. The criminal slaps a fake mole on Kermit, making him look like the fugitive, and has him sent to the Siberian Gulag in his place. Constantine then takes Kermit's spot, fooling most of the Muppets (except Animal), while Dominic secures them fancy venues that conveniently sit near high-value targets.

In the Gulag, Kermit's escape attempts are thwarted by prison guard Nadya, who puts him in charge of the prison talent show, where he bonds with the inmates. Meanwhile, on tour, Constantine and Dominic use the concerts as a distraction to steal valuable art. Their crimes attract the attention of Interpol agent Jean Pierre Napoleon and CIA agent Sam Eagle, who team up to investigate. The tour, now diverted to Madrid and Dublin, continues as a front for Constantine's master plan: to steal the British Crown Jewels. However, Walter and Fozzie Bear grow suspicious, discovering Dominic is bribing critics and realizing the impostor is not the real Kermit. After being attacked by Constantine, Walter, Fozzie, and Animal (who was aware of Constantine's deception from the start) escape and decide to travel to Siberia to rescue Kermit.

Constantine proposes to Miss Piggy, planning a wedding at the Tower of London as the perfect distraction for the final heist. While Dominic — revealed to be Jean's nemesis, "the Lemur" — steals the Crown Jewels, Kermit, rescued from the Gulag by his friends, storms the wedding to expose Constantine. After Kermit tries to stop Constantine, Miss Piggy asks both frogs if they will marry her, which ends in Constantine's cover being blown. Constantine then reveals himself to the others and has placed a bomb on Miss Piggy’s ring and Beaker stops the bomb with his magnetic machine.

Constantine captures Miss Piggy and sends her to the roof to escape. Dominic tries to double cross Constantine, but forgets the first rule of it by telling him about the double cross. It backfires on him as Constantine blows up the helicopter doors, which sends Dominic flying out of the helicopter. The helicopter tries to fly away, but the Muppets form a ladder and stop it in its place. Kermit manages to climb up to the helicopter, but is stopped by Constantine holding a gun. Miss Piggy breaks free and stops Constantine by whacking him all over the place. Constantine and Dominic are arrested. Nadya and her guards track Kermit to London, but upon seeing how much the Muppets need him, she drops the charges. The world tour concludes with a final show back at the Gulag, featuring the imprisoned villains in the prison talent show.

== Cast ==
- Ricky Gervais as Dominic Badguy/The Lemur (/ˈbæddʒiː/ BAD-jee), the world's second most wanted criminal and Constantine's accomplice who poses as the manager of a fictional international talent agency.
- Ty Burrell as Jean Pierre Napoleon, an Inspector Clouseau-esque French Interpol agent who works with Sam Eagle on finding Constantine.
- Tina Fey as Nadya, a high-ranking prison guard at Gulag 38B who is obsessed with Kermit the Frog.

=== Muppet performers ===
- Steve Whitmire as Kermit the Frog, Foo-Foo, Statler, Beaker, Lips, Rizzo the Rat, Link Hogthrob, the Newsman, Andy Pig and Gulag Prisoner (onscreen cameo) (Additionally, Kermit is portrayed by Jim Henson in a scene featuring archival material from Sesame Street and The Muppet Movie.)
- Eric Jacobson as Miss Piggy, Fozzie Bear, Sam Eagle, Animal and Marvin Suggs
- Dave Goelz as Gonzo the Great, Dr. Bunsen Honeydew, Zoot, Beauregard, Waldorf and Randy Pig
- Bill Barretta as Pepe the King Prawn, Bobo the Bear, Big Mean Carl, Rowlf the Dog, Dr. Teeth, The Swedish Chef, Carlo Flamingo, Baby Boss and Leprechaun Security Guard
- David Rudman as Scooter, Janice, Miss Poogy, Bobby Benson, Wayne and Thingy-Thing (Puppeteer) (in the "I Can Get You What You Want (Cockatoo in Malibu)" number)
- Matt Vogel as Constantine, '80s Robot, Sweetums, Floyd Pepper, Pops, Robin the Frog, Lew Zealand, Crazy Harry, Camilla the Chicken, Uncle Deadly, and Dr. Julius Strangepork
- Peter Linz as Walter, Manolo Flamingo, Finger-snapping prisoner in "The Big House" number, and Baby
- Louise Gold as Annie Sue and Kangaroo

=== Cameo guest stars ===
Tony Bennett, Lady Gaga, Salma Hayek, Saoirse Ronan and Christoph Waltz appear as themselves.

Jemaine Clement plays The Prison King; Danny Trejo, Dylan "Hornswoggle" Postl, Ray Liotta, Tom Hiddleston and Josh Groban appear as Gulag 38B inmates. Stanley Tucci plays Ivan, a Gulag 38B Watchtower Guard.

James McAvoy, Chloë Grace Moretz, Miranda Richardson, Russell Tovey, Mackenzie Crook, Toby Jones, Rob Corddry, Hugh Bonneville, Tom Hollander, Sean Combs, Celine Dion, Zach Galifianakis, Frank Langella, Ross Lynch, Til Schweiger and Usher also appear in minor cameos.

Some actors filmed scenes that were cut from the theatrical film release, but were later restored on the film's DVD and Blu-ray release. The actors include: Dexter Fletcher and Peter Serafinowicz as Gulag guards, and Bridgit Mendler, Debby Ryan, Jake Short, and Tyrel Jackson Williams as wedding guests.

== Production ==
=== Development ===
In March 2012, after the critical and commercial success of The Muppets, Walt Disney Studios negotiated a deal with James Bobin and Nicholas Stoller to direct and write, respectively, an eighth installment. Disney green-lit the film on April 24, 2012. Along with Brian Henson, Bobin is the only other person to have directed two Muppets films.

Writing began in April 2012 after a couple of weeks of outlining. Jason Segel, co-writer and star of the previous film, opted not to be involved in the eighth entry, citing that he had accomplished his ambition of bringing the characters to the forefront with the 2011 film. Despite this, Bobin and Stoller quickly began work on the film based on Disney's demand. Taking on the form of a caper, the film was inspired by both The Great Muppet Caper and The Muppets Take Manhattan as well as The Pink Panther and The Thomas Crown Affair. Bobin said that the film was "a tip of the hat to the old-school crime capers of the '60s, but featuring a frog, a pig, a bear, and a dog—no panthers, even pink ones—along with the usual Muppet-y mix of mayhem, music and laughs".

The first actor to be attached to the film was Christoph Waltz in the role of an Interpol inspector. Waltz dropped out due to scheduling conflicts (though he would end up appearing in a cameo appearance as himself) and was replaced by Ty Burrell. In December 2012, Ricky Gervais confirmed his casting. Tina Fey was later confirmed in January of the following year.

=== Filming ===
Originally commissioned under the title The Muppets ... Again!, principal photography began in January 2013, at London's Pinewood Studios in Iver, Buckinghamshire. Filming also took place at the Tower of London, a site where the Crown Estate rarely grants permission to do so. Additional filming locations in London included Leicester Square, Tower Hill, the Richmond Theatre, Wilton's Music Hall, Freemasons' Hall and The Historic Dockyard, Chatham. In addition to the United Kingdom, scenes were also shot at Union Station, the Walt Disney Studios and Paramount Studios lots, and on Hollywood Boulevard (to recreate the previous film's ending) in Los Angeles. On June 13, 2013, the title of the film was changed from The Muppets ... Again! to Muppets Most Wanted, although the original title is mentioned in the opening song.

The production design was done by Eve Stewart, who took a tongue-in-cheek approach to each country setting while also being influenced by the retro style of "crime capers of the '60s and '70s". Rahel Afiley returned as the costume designer, compiling the wardrobe for both Muppet and human characters. In addition to Afiley's own creations, English fashion designer Vivienne Westwood also contributed four outfits for Miss Piggy while United States retailer Brooks Brothers created more than 200 items for the male cast. Discussing Miss Piggy's wedding gown, Westwood said, "It's called the Court dress and is inspired by 17th-century English royalty and the court of King Charles II. It has been designed ... in a white pearl sequin fabric made from recycled water bottles."

=== Post-production ===
"If we are doing CG compositing, ... we always have puppeteers perform it. We never go down the road of having a full CG character, which you could easily do. It feels that the joy of this movie is the Muppets exist. They're real; you can touch them. There are very few forms of entertainment in the contemporary world that exist like that, and Muppets are the last bastion of it, and it would be shame to lose that."

— James Bobin on balancing practical and digital effects.

Visual effects were done primarily by The Senate Visual Effects. The effects studio worked on 425 shots that included CG builds and set extensions, matte paintings, particle and laser effects, animation, and rod removals. Additional visual effects work was done by Double Negative, Factory VFX, and Nvizible. As with the previous installment, the film required blue screen for scenes that required digital compositing. While green screen is more traditional for color keying, the screen's shade of green would clash with Kermit and therefore be unusable; Sam Eagle's shade of blue is suitable on blue screen.

Audio mixing and editorial services were done by Todd Soundelux and 424 Post. Based out of Todd-AO's Santa Monica facility, Kevin O'Connell and Beau Borders worked on the film as re-recording mixers alongside 424 Post's supervising sound editors Kami Asgar and Sean McCormack.

The first assembly cut of the film ran around two and a half hours.

The film was dedicated to longtime Muppet performer Jerry Nelson, who died during the film's development, and Jane Henson, who died two months into production.

=== Music ===
The musical score for Muppets Most Wanted was composed by Christophe Beck, with additional songs by Bret McKenzie. A soundtrack album was released by Walt Disney Records on March 18, 2014. It features six original songs by McKenzie as well as re-recordings of contemporary music and past Muppet songs, including "Together Again" from The Muppets Take Manhattan. A separate album entirely containing Beck's score (paired with the score for The Muppets, also composed by Beck) was released by Walt Disney Records and Intrada Records on April 15, 2014.

== Release ==
Muppets Most Wanted held its world premiere on March 11, 2014, at the El Capitan Theatre in Hollywood, California. The film was theatrically released in the United States on March 21 and in the United Kingdom on March 28, 2014. Theatrically, the film was accompanied by Pixar's Monsters University short Party Central.

=== Marketing ===
A teaser trailer was released on August 6, 2013, and was attached theatrically to screenings of Planes. On November 20, 2013, two different trailers were released, one for the United States and one for the United Kingdom.

In February 2014, the Muppets starred alongside Terry Crews in a commercial for Toyota that aired during the Super Bowl. Later that month, Disney partnered with Subway to promote healthy eating through an advertisement featuring the Muppets. In early March, the restaurant chain started giving away free Muppet-themed bags with kids meals. Spoof posters were released for the film, parodying Skyfall (called Frogfall), The World Is Not Enough (called The Pig Is Not Enough), Face/Off (called Fraud/Frog), and Tinker Tailor Soldier Spy (called Animal Piggy Frog Spy).

In February, the Android and iOS game My Muppets Show added content from the film, including a Big House stage, various props from the movie, and Constantine as a discoverable/purchasable character. From March 20 to April 1, Disney's online game Club Penguin hosted a special Muppets World Tour event. Players were able to visit nine country-themed rooms and perform alongside several Muppets.

=== Home media ===
Muppets Most Wanted was released by Walt Disney Studios Home Entertainment on Blu-ray and DVD on August 12, 2014. The Blu-ray bonus features include three cuts of the film: the original theatrical cut (106 minutes), a truncated Statler and Waldorf cut (2 minutes), and an extended cut featuring 12 minutes of scenes not shown in the theatrical version (124 minutes). Also included are a blooper reel, a featurette called "Rizzo's Biggest Fan," and a music video of "I'll Get You What You Want" featuring Bret McKenzie.

=== Streaming ===
Muppets Most Wanted became available to stream on Disney+ upon the launch of the service in November 2019. In September 2020, the film was added to Netflix in the United States and was removed in September 2021. The "Unnecessarily Extended Cut" became available to stream on Disney+ starting on June 14, 2026.

== Reception ==
=== Box office ===
Muppets Most Wanted grossed $51.2 million in North America, and $29.2 million in other countries, for a worldwide total of $80.4 million. The film earned $17 million and opened to number two in its first weekend, with $17 million, behind Divergent. Considering that pre-release tracking had forecast Muppets Most Wanted at opening with takings of more than $20 million, Walt Disney Studios Motion Pictures distribution chief Dave Hollis said the film's opening was "definitely disappointing". Hollis said there was never a comparison between the previous film and its sequel, since Thanksgiving is a concentrated time for family moviegoing. In its second weekend, the film dropped to number three, grossing $11.3 million, leading to a better second weekend than its predecessor. In its third weekend, the film dropped to number five, grossing $5.1 million. In its fourth weekend, the film dropped to number nine, grossing $2.3 million.

=== Critical response ===
Review aggregator Rotten Tomatoes gave the film a score of 80% based on reviews from 207 critics, with a rating average of 6.7/10. The site's consensus stated: "While it may not reach the delirious heights of The Muppets, Muppets Most Wanted still packs in enough clever gags, catchy songs, and celebrity cameos to satisfy fans of all ages." Metacritic gave the film a score of 61/100 based on 37 reviews indicating "generally favorable reviews". CinemaScore audiences gave Muppets Most Wanted a "B+" grade rating on an A+ to F scale.

Alonso Duralde of The Wrap compared the film favorably to the 2011 predecessor, elaborating, "Muppets Most Wanted remains sensational and celebrational, proving beyond a doubt that these beloved characters will continue to lead a plush life on the big screen for years to come." Despite reservations over the previous installment, Brian Henson called Most Wanted a great Muppets film, saying, "I think my dad would be thrilled the Muppets are continuing. That's a big deal." Peter Hartlaub of the San Francisco Chronicle gave the film three out of four stars, saying "It just feels like something the original Muppet creators might have done." John Hartl of The Seattle Times gave the film three out of four stars, saying "Most of the laughs come courtesy of Tina Fey, in the role of a Siberian prison guard who can't/won't stop dancing." Todd McCarthy of The Hollywood Reporter had a mixed reaction; praising Bret McKenzie's songs and the film's humor, but labeling the film overall as "an oddly off-key follow-up". Justin Chang of Variety gave a negative review, stating that the film "looks and sounds eager to please but immediately feels like a more slapdash, aimless affair, trying—and mostly failing—to turn its stalled creativity into some sort of self-referential joke." Anna Smith of Time Out gave the film three out of five stars, saying "'Everybody knows that the sequel's never quite as good,' sing our fluffy friends during the opening number of a film with much to live up to after 2011's terrific reboot, The Muppets. The joke proves self-fulfilling." Bill Goodykoontz of The Arizona Republic gave the film four out of five stars, saying "Although this movie has lots of laughs and a willingness to poke fun at itself, it doesn't quite recapture the magic of the last movie. Close, but not quite."

Jake Coyle of the Associated Press gave the film two and a half stars out of four, saying "Muppets Most Wanted fails to whip up the kind of furry frenzy that makes the Muppets special." Peter Travers of Rolling Stone gave the film two and a half stars out of three, saying "The breaking point of stretching this one joke is reached early. Luckily, Muppet good will helps get you through the rest." Joe Neumaier of the New York Daily News gave the film three out of five stars, saying "The film's slightly overplotted feel is offset by the zippiest musical numbers since the Muppets' deservedly beloved 1979 film." J. R. Jones of the Chicago Reader gave the film a negative review, saying "The verbal wit is fairly weak this time around, though as in the previous film there's an endless succession of three-second star cameos." Tom Russo of The Boston Globe gave the film three out of four stars, saying "The well-worn plot basics are dressed up nicely by the film's consistently clever humor, as well as a celebrity cameo roster that's stacked even by Muppet standards." Bill Zwecker of the Chicago Sun-Times gave the film three out of four stars, saying "The pacing is spot-on, and Fey's Russian guard and Ty Burrell's Interpol agent are wonderful human additions to this comedic romp." Neil Genzlinger of The New York Times gave the film a positive review, saying "It all adds up to an eventful entry in the Muppet film library but not a classic one." Claudia Puig of USA Today gave the film three out of four stars, calling the film "A breezy, mirthful caper enlivened by the comic talents of Ricky Gervais, Ty Burrell and Tina Fey."

Frank Lovece of Newsday gave the film three out of four stars, saying "While it may not be sensational, it's still an inspirational, celebrational, Muppetational Muppet show." Peter Howell of the Toronto Star gave the film two and a half stars out of four, saying "You don't go to a Muppet movie looking for anything other than a few laughs with beloved puppet pals. Mission accomplished—ka-ching!—on that front." David Hiltbrand of The Philadelphia Inquirer gave the film two and a half stars out of four, saying "Sunny and cheerful, Muppets Most Wanted is a cascade of epic silliness, good for a few fleeting and familiar chuckles." Chris Nashawaty of Entertainment Weekly gave the film a B, saying "The songs are infectious, but the rest (despite turns by Tina Fey and Ty Burrell) lacks some of the gang's usual feel-good joy." Christopher Orr of The Atlantic gave the film a positive review, saying "Kids will enjoy it, and there are more than enough clever gags to keep parents amused. But the film lacks the tenderness and rich nostalgia that made The Muppets such an improbable delight." Erik Adams of The A.V. Club gave the film a B−, saying "The Muppets are creatures of indulgence, and their sense of humor is one of excess. Muppets Most Wanted is a mess of a movie, but anything tidier would be a poor fit." Betsy Sharkey of the Los Angeles Times gave the film a positive review, saying "Though there are many delicious little moments tucked inside, the action heads in so many directions it can be dizzying to keep up." Steve Persall of the Tampa Bay Times gave the film a B, saying "Muppets Most Wanted is pleasant enough to recommend as family entertainment. But the movie falls short of what immediately preceded it, musically and emotionally."

Dana Stevens of Slate gave the film a negative review, saying "There's something sour and strained about this movie that's at odds with the usual Muppet ethos of game, let's-put-on-a-show cheer. Maybe that's because of the inordinate amount of screen time spent on the rivalry between two villains who are as uninteresting as they are unpleasant." Michael Phillips of the Chicago Tribune gave the film two out of four stars, saying "Part of the problem here is one of proportion: The movie throws a misjudged majority of the material to the villains and lets the unfashionably sincere and sweet-natured Muppets fend for themselves." Robbie Collin of The Daily Telegraph gave the film two out of five stars, saying "Muppet film number eight is a resounding disappointment: it's uneven and often grating, with only a few moments of authentic delight, and almost none of the sticky-sweet, toast-and-honey crunch of its vastly enjoyable 2011 forerunner." James Berardinelli of ReelViews gave the film three out of four stars, saying "The inevitable sequel, arriving three years later, isn't as giddily entertaining as its predecessor but much of the charm remains, making this an ideal destination for a family excursion." Eric Henderson of Slant Magazine gave the film three out of four stars, saying "Freed from the burden of starting anew, the film restores the Muppets' rightful place as stars of their own show." Steve Davis of The Austin Chronicle gave the film three out of five stars, saying "This re-energized franchise has found its second wind, bursting with a creative vitality and boisterous humor that makes everything seem new again."

=== Accolades ===
List of awards and nominations
Award	Category	Recipients	Result
British Academy Children's Awards	BAFTA Kid's Vote - Film in 2014		Nominated
Golden Tomato Awards	Best Reviewed Kids/Family Film		Won
19th Satellite Awards	Best Original Song	"I'll Get You What You Want (Cockatoo in Malibu)" - Bret McKenzie	Nominated
