= Disney Worldwide Outreach Program =

Walt Disney Company charitable division

The Disney Worldwide Outreach Program is the Walt Disney Company's charitable division, aiming to help global and local charitable organizations.

In 1983, at Disneyland, Disney formed the "Disneyland Community Action Team", which worked with the Special Olympics, the Orangewood Children's Home and other charities. Its VoluntEARS program spawned from this initiative in 1992. The DisneyHand program, soon renamed the Disney Worldwide Outreach program, was created for corporate standardization.

Its national partners include the Make-A-Wish Foundation, Starlight Starbright Children's Foundation, Toys for Tots, First Book and the Boys & Girls Clubs of America.

The Disney Teacher Award, awarded to 44 honorees in 2006, is also part of the Disney Worldwide Outreach Program.
