= The Muppets =

Puppet characters created by Jim Henson

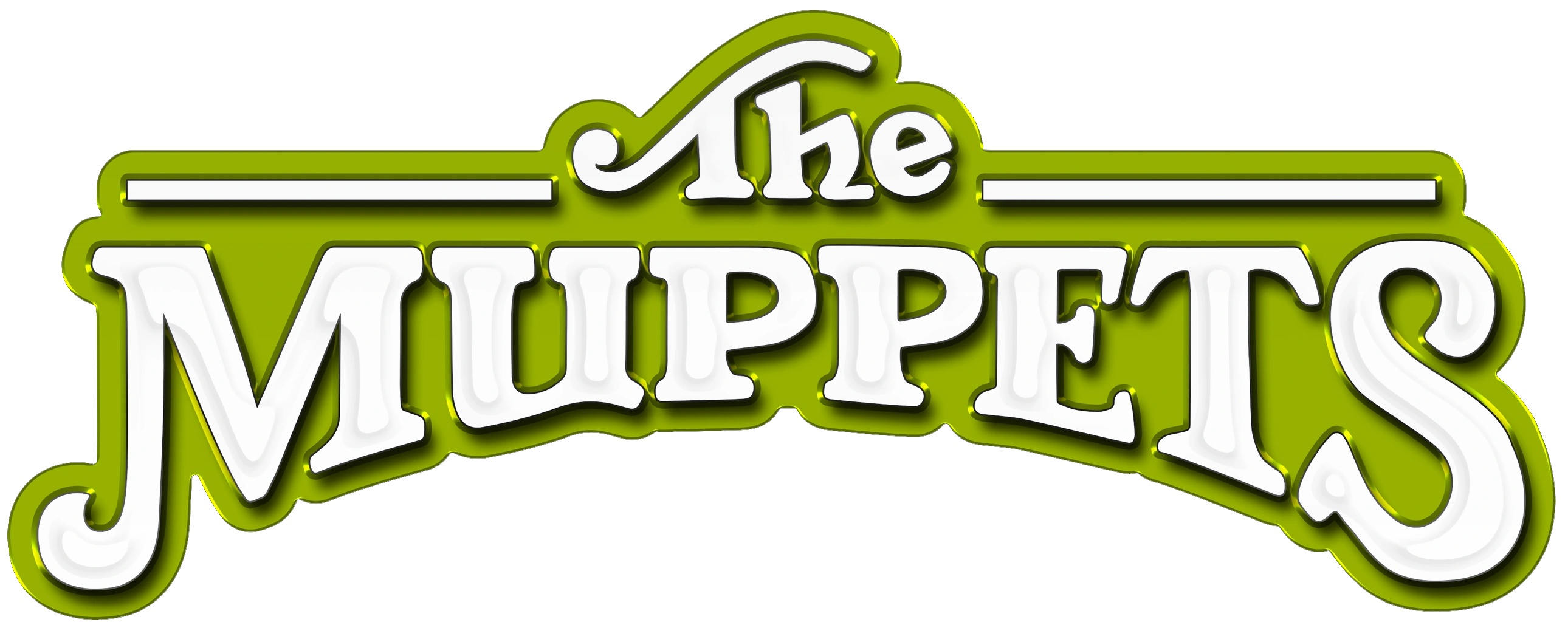
- Logo used since 2022
- Created by: Jim Henson
- Original work: Sam and Friends (1955–1961)
- Owners: The Jim Henson Company (1955–2004); The Muppets Studio (Disney; 2004–present)
- Years: 1955–present

Print publications
- Book: Books and comics

Films and television
- Film: Film list
- Television series: Television list
- Web series: Statler and Waldorf: From the Balcony; The Muppets Kitchen with Cat Cora
- Animated series: Muppet Babies; Dog City; Muppet Babies

Games
- Video game: Video game list

Audio
- Soundtrack: Discography

Miscellaneous
- Theme park attractions: Muppet*Vision 3D; The Muppets Present...Great Moments in American History; Muppet Mobile Lab; Rock 'n' Roller Coaster

The Muppets are an American ensemble cast of puppet characters known for an absurdist, slapstick, burlesque, and self-referential style of musical and variety-sketch comedy. Created by Jim Henson in 1955, the eponymous media franchise encompasses films, television, music, and other media associated with the characters. Owned by the Jim Henson Company for nearly five decades, the Muppets were acquired by the Walt Disney Company in 2004, which established the Muppets Studio division to oversee the characters.

The Muppets originated in the short-form television series Sam and Friends, which aired on WRC-TV and in syndication from 1955 to 1961. Following appearances on late-night talk shows and in advertising during the 1960s, the Muppets began appearing on Sesame Street (1969–present) during their formative years in the early to mid-1970s and attained celebrity status and international recognition through The Muppet Show (1976–1981), their flagship sketch comedy television series that received four Primetime Emmy Award wins and 21 nominations during its five-year run.

During the late 1970s and 1980s, the Muppets diversified into theatrical films, including The Muppet Movie (1979), The Great Muppet Caper (1981), and The Muppets Take Manhattan (1984). Additionally, new Muppet characters were created for Fraggle Rock (1983–1987). Disney began involvement with the Muppets in the late 1980s, during which Henson entered negotiations to sell the Jim Henson Company.

The Muppets continued their media presence on television with series such as The Jim Henson Hour (1989) and Muppets Tonight (1996–1998), both of which were similar in format to The Muppet Show, as well as the animated spin-off Muppet Babies (1984–1991); three theatrical films: The Muppet Christmas Carol (1992), Muppet Treasure Island (1996) and Muppets from Space (1999), and the television film It's a Very Merry Muppet Christmas Movie (2002).

Disney bought the Muppets and Bear in the Big Blue House (1997–2006) from the Henson family in February 2004 and manages the characters through the Muppets Studio, though the deal excluded the characters from Sesame Street and Fraggle Rock. Subsequent projects have included the television film The Muppets' Wizard of Oz (2005), two theatrical films: The Muppets (2011) and Muppets Most Wanted (2014), a primetime series (2015–2016), the streaming television series The Muppets Mayhem (2023), and most recently the television special The Muppet Show (2026).

Throughout seven decades, the Muppets have been regarded as a staple of the entertainment industry and popular culture in the United States and English-speaking areas around the world. They have been recognized by various cultural institutions and organizations, including the American Film Institute, the Hollywood Walk of Fame, the Library of Congress, and both Academies of Motion Picture Arts and Sciences and Television Arts and Sciences.

== History ==
=== 1950s–1960s: Beginnings ===
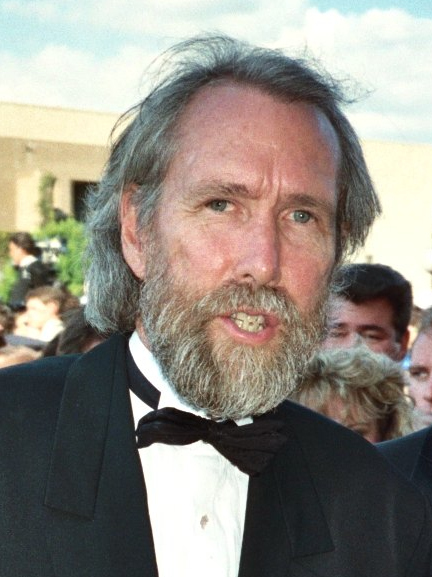
Jim Henson in 1989

The Muppets were created by puppeteer Jim Henson in the 1950s; Henson initially claimed that he coined the term Muppet as a blend of the words marionette and puppet, though he later denied this. (Note: Some published versions of Tobias Smollett's novel The Adventures of Roderick Random, first published in 1748, refer to "the modish diversions of the town, such as plays, operas, masquerades, drums, assemblies, and muppet-shows"; other versions have "puppet-shows" instead.) Henson's earliest creations included Kermit the Frog, who became his most recognizable character. Originally conceived for an adult audience, the Muppets were introduced in 1955 in Sam and Friends, a short-form television series produced for WRC-TV in Washington, D.C. Developed by Henson and his future wife, Jane Nebel, the series was the first form of puppet media not to incorporate a physical proscenium arch typical of such works, relying instead on the natural framing of the television set through which it was viewed.

During the 1960s, the characters—in particular, Kermit and Rowlf the Dog—appeared in skits on several late-night talk shows and on television commercials, including The Ed Sullivan Show. Rowlf became the first Muppet character to appear regularly on network television when he began appearing with Jimmy Dean on The Jimmy Dean Show. In 1966, Joan Ganz Cooney and Lloyd Morrisett began developing a children's educational television program and approached Henson to design a cast of Muppet characters during this stage. Produced by the Children's Television Workshop, the program debuted as Sesame Street in 1969 on NET, and later PBS.

Henson and his creative team became closely involved with Sesame Street during the years that followed; Henson waived his performance fee in exchange for retaining ownership rights to the Muppet characters created for the program. Sesame Street garnered a positive response, and the Muppets' involvement in the series became a vital component of its increasing popularity, providing an "effective and pleasurable viewing" method of presentation for its educational curriculum.

=== 1970s: The Muppet Show and foray into film ===
In the early 1970s, the Muppets continued their presence in television, primarily appearing in The Land of Gorch segments during the first season of NBC's Saturday Night Live. The Muppet characters featured in The Land of Gorch behaved boorishly and made frequent references to drug abuse, sexual activity, and consumption of alcohol, adult themes that Henson wanted to explore with the characters in an effort to not let him nor the Muppets be typecast as entertainment for children. The writers of Saturday Night Live clashed with Henson's vision for the program, often refusing to commit to writing the segments, and several cast members bemoaned the inclusion of the Muppets. Eventually, the collaboration proved too divisive, and the Muppets departed Saturday Night Live after the first season.

As his involvement with Sesame Street continued, Henson began developing a network television series featuring the Muppets, but distinct from Sesame Street; this series would be aimed at a more adult audience and would satirize sketch comedy. Two television pilots, The Muppets Valentine Show and The Muppet Show: Sex and Violence, aired on ABC in 1974 and 1975, respectively.

After ABC passed on the pilots and other networks in the United States expressed little interest in the project, British producer Lew Grade approached Henson and agreed to co-produce the series for Associated Television. Debuting in 1976, The Muppet Show introduced new characters such as Miss Piggy, Fozzie Bear, and Gonzo, alongside existing characters such as Kermit and Rowlf. Aired in first-run syndication in the United States, The Muppet Show became increasingly popular due to its sketch-variety format, unique form of vaudeville-style humor, and prolific roster of guest stars. It was nominated for twenty-one Primetime Emmy Awards during its run, winning four, including Outstanding Variety Series in 1978. The success of The Muppet Show allowed Henson Associates to diversify into theatrical films, the first of which, The Muppet Movie, was released in 1979.

=== 1980s–1990s: Subsequent projects ===
Following The Muppet Movie were The Great Muppet Caper and The Muppets Take Manhattan, released in 1981 and 1984, respectively. Collectively, the three films received four Academy Award nominations. The Muppet Show ended its five-season run in 1981. In 1983, Henson debuted Fraggle Rock, which aired on HBO in the United States until 1987.

In 1989, Henson entered negotiations with Michael Eisner and the Walt Disney Company, in which Disney would acquire Jim Henson Productions and, in turn, the Muppets. Disney expressed interest in purchasing the company for $150 million. Eisner was also interested in acquiring the Sesame Street Muppet characters, but Henson declined that proposal, considering it a "non-starter" for the deal. An "agreement in principle" for the acquisition was publicly announced by Disney and Henson at the Disney-MGM Studios theme park in Walt Disney World Resort on August 28, 1989, along with plans for Muppets-themed attractions to debut at that park and Disneyland the following year. In anticipation of the acquisition, the television special The Muppets at Walt Disney World premiered on May 6, 1990.

However, the proposed merger was cancelled after Henson's death on May 16, 1990. Nevertheless, Disney initiated a licensing agreement with Jim Henson Productions to continue developing Muppets attractions and the use of the characters within the Disney theme parks. The following year, Muppet*Vision 3D debuted at Disney–MGM Studios, the only attraction successfully developed from the original plans. Walt Disney Pictures also co-produced the fourth and fifth Muppets films, The Muppet Christmas Carol (1992) and Muppet Treasure Island (1996), with Jim Henson Productions. The characters subsequently starred in Muppets Tonight, which aired on ABC from 1996 to 1998; and a sixth film, Muppets from Space, released by Columbia Pictures in 1999.

=== 2000s: Disney acquisition ===
In 2000, the Jim Henson Company was sold to EM.TV & Merchandising AG for $680 million. However, EM.TV's stock collapsed and the Henson family re-acquired the company in 2003, with the exception of the Sesame Street characters, which were in the interim sold to Sesame Workshop. In 2002, the film It's a Very Merry Muppet Christmas Movie premiered on NBC.

Fourteen years after negotiations began, Disney acquired the Muppets intellectual property from the Henson company for $75 million on February 17, 2004. The acquisition consisted of a majority of the Muppet film and television library, as well as the Bear in the Big Blue House television series. Exceptions included the Sesame Street characters; the Fraggle Rock characters, which were retained by Henson; the distribution rights to four films: the 1984 feature film The Muppets Take Manhattan, the 1999 feature film Muppets from Space, and the 2002 direct-to-video film Kermit's Swamp Years, which were retained by Sony Pictures Entertainment; and the 2002 TV movie film It's a Very Merry Muppet Christmas Movie, retained by NBCUniversal Television Distribution. Following the acquisition, Disney formed the Muppets Studio (originally The Muppets Holding Company), a wholly owned subsidiary responsible for managing the characters and franchise. As a result, the term "Muppet" became a legal trademark of Disney; under license from Disney, Sesame Workshop continues to use the term for their characters, as well as archival footage of Kermit the Frog.

Henson retained the rights to several productions featuring the Disney-owned Muppet characters, including Emmet Otter's Jug-Band Christmas, The Christmas Toy, Sesame Street: 20 and Still Counting, Henson's Place, Billy Bunny's Animal Songs, the original Dog City special, and Donna's Day. While some of these have since been released uncut, most current releases of Emmet Otter's Jug-Band Christmas and The Christmas Toy omit the appearances by Kermit the Frog. The 2015 ABC Family airing, the 2017 DVD and the 2018 Blu-ray releases of Emmet Otter's Jug-Band Christmas and the Amazon Prime Video release of The Christmas Toy reinstate Kermit's scenes.

After the acquisition was complete, Disney gradually began reintroducing the franchise to the mainstream, synergistically promoting the Muppets across different parts of the company. The Muppets made appearances on Disney Channel and starred in the ABC television film The Muppets' Wizard of Oz (2005). A television special, A Muppets Christmas: Letters to Santa, premiered on NBC on December 17, 2008. As a method of regaining a wider audience, Disney produced a series of vignettes for YouTube and Disney.com. A cover version of Queen's "Bohemian Rhapsody" was among these projects and immediately went viral, ultimately amassing 90 million views and winning two Webby Awards. In 2010, the Muppets starred in The Muppets Kitchen with Cat Cora, which co-starred Cat Cora and showcased cooking demonstrations. That same year, Disney used the Muppets to promote their volunteerism program at the company's theme parks. A Halloween special featuring the Muppets was developed during that time and expected to air on ABC that October, but was canceled.

=== 2010s–present: Renewed success; current projects ===
A 2013 Muppets short, made to promote Muppets Most Wanted.

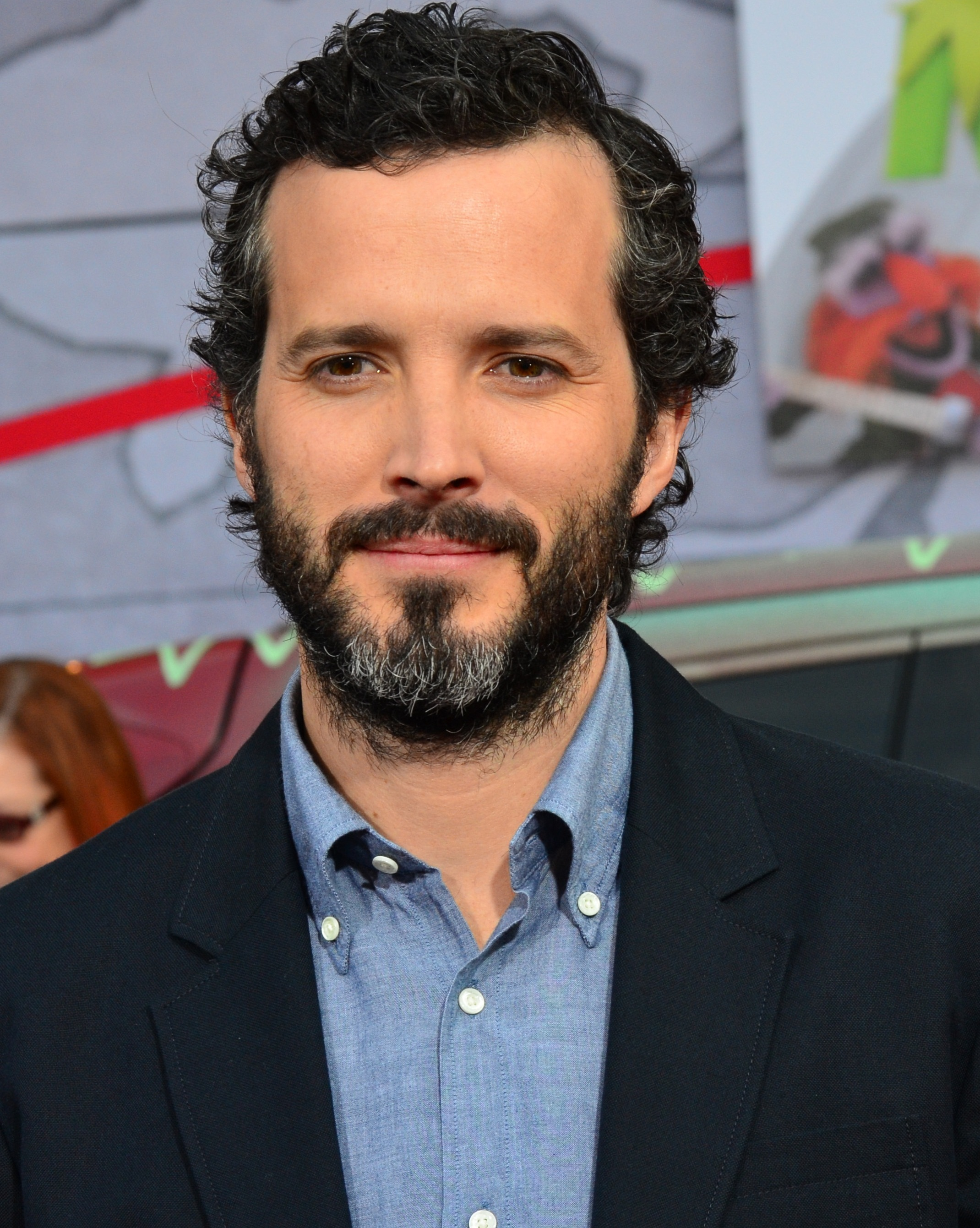
Songwriter Bret McKenzie won the Academy Award for Best Original Song in 2012 for "Man or Muppet" from The Muppets, winning the first Oscar for the franchise.

In 2011, the Muppets were featured in an eponymous seventh film, The Muppets, intended to serve as a "creative reboot" for the characters. Walt Disney Pictures had been furthering development on a Muppets film since 2008, when it considered adapting an unused screenplay by Jerry Juhl. Directed by James Bobin, written by Jason Segel and Nicholas Stoller, and starring Segel, Amy Adams, Chris Cooper, and Rashida Jones, The Muppets was a critical and commercial success, becoming the highest-grossing puppet film of all time and winning the Academy Award for Best Original Song for Bret McKenzie's "Man or Muppet". During the film's publicity campaign, the Muppets appeared in promotional advertisements and marketing efforts by Disney and were also featured in a promotional video for Google+. In March 2012, the Muppets received a collective star on the Hollywood Walk of Fame. That year, the Muppets hosted a Just for Laughs comedy gala in Montreal.

Following the release of The Muppets, Disney announced an eighth film in 2012, with Bobin and Stoller returning to direct and write, respectively. Muppets Most Wanted was released in 2014 and starred Ricky Gervais, Tina Fey, and Ty Burrell. The film received positive reviews but was a commercial disappointment at the box office.

Disney Theatrical Productions announced in 2013 that a live show based on the Muppets was in active development and that a 15-minute show had been conducted by Thomas Schumacher and directed by Alex Timbers to see how the technical components would work. Muppet Moments, an interstitial television series, premiered on Disney Jr. in April 2015. The short-form series features conversations between the Muppets and young children.

After the release of Muppets Most Wanted, Disney was interested in expanding the Muppets' presence across other media, particularly in television. Discussions for a new primetime series began internally within The Muppets Studio. By April 2015, Bill Prady was commissioned to write a script for a pilot with the working title Muppets 2015. In May 2015, ABC commissioned an eponymous series, co-developed by Prady and Bob Kushell and directed by Randall Einhorn. Developed as a parody of other mockumentary-style series such as The Office, Modern Family, and Parks and Recreation, The Muppets portrayed the everyday personal and professional lives of the Muppets in Los Angeles as they produced a late-night talk show hosted by Miss Piggy. The ABC series portrayed the characters in more adult situations than previous incarnations, including depictions of alcohol consumption, sexual innuendos, and mild profanity. The series premiered on September 22, 2015, in the United States, and received mixed reviews, with critics praising the show's adult humor but criticizing the writing and characterization. The Muppets was canceled after one season, which concluded on March 1, 2016.

On September 24, 2016, The Muppets were featured in a benefit concert called "Puppets for Puppetry," hosted by the Jim Henson Company for the Center for Puppetry Arts. This concert honored puppeteer Dave Goelz and celebrated the 30th anniversary of Labyrinth. Musical guests Gerard Way and Ray Toro of My Chemical Romance, along with Jarrod Alexander, Matt Gorney, and Jamie Muhoberac performed a tribute to Labyrinth with a medley of songs including "Underground" and "As the World Falls Down".

In September 2017, the Muppets performed a live concert series at the Hollywood Bowl, hosted by Bobby Moynihan. This performance was followed by a second event in July 2018 at London's O2 Arena, their first outside of the United States.

In February 2018, Disney announced that a streaming television reboot series was in development for Disney+. The project, known as Muppets Live Another Day, was intended as a limited-run series set in the 1980s after the events of The Muppets Take Manhattan and depicted Kermit recruiting the Muppets to locate Rowlf the Dog after his disappearance. The series was intended to be directed by Jason Moore; written by Josh Gad, Adam Horowitz and Eddy Kitsis; produced by ABC Signature Studios and The Muppets Studio; and feature original music by Robert Lopez and Kristen Anderson-Lopez. After an executive change at The Muppets Studio that prompted a different creative direction for the Muppets, Disney canceled development on the project in September 2019. A second Disney+ series, Muppets Now, a short-form improvisational comedy series, was announced in August 2019 and was released on July 31, 2020. Muppets Haunted Mansion, a Halloween special based on the Disney attraction of the same name, was released on October 8, 2021.

A third Disney+ series, The Muppets Mayhem, was ordered in March 2022. The series was developed and written by Adam F. Goldberg, Bill Barretta and Jeff Yorkes and starred Dr. Teeth and the Electric Mayhem, alongside Lilly Singh and Tahj Mowry. The series received five Emmy Award nominations at the Children's and Family Emmy Awards, winning one for Outstanding Children's or Family Viewing Series.

A revival special of The Muppet Show produced by 20th Television, Disney Branded Television, The Muppets Studio, and Point Grey Pictures for Disney+, premiered on February 4, 2026 to coincide with the series' 50th anniversary. The special starred Muppet performers Bill Barretta, Dave Goelz, Eric Jacobson, Peter Linz, David Rudman and Matt Vogel performing the majority of the Muppet characters, alongside a supporting cast of additional performers; Goelz reprised the same character roles he originated during the show's original 1976–1981 run. The special was directed by Alex Timbers and featured special guest star Sabrina Carpenter. The special received universal acclaim, winning four Primetime Emmy Awards including Outstanding Variety Special.

Various Muppets have been featured in The Game Awards since 2022, Starting with Animal presenting Best Soundtrack and score in 2022, Gonzo performing in 2023, Statler and Waldorf providing commentary in 2024, and Miss Piggy singing "The Game Awards Will Never Let You Down" with Rowlf the Dog playing the piano in 2025 In 2026, The Muppets performed in the 2026 FIFA World Cup final halftime show.

A Miss Piggy film was revealed by Jennifer Lawrence during a podcast interview. Lawrence is producing it with Emma Stone while Cole Escola will write the script.

== Characters ==
The principal characters of The Muppet Show and subsequent media include Kermit the Frog, Miss Piggy, Fozzie Bear, Gonzo, Rowlf the Dog, Scooter, Dr. Teeth and the Electric Mayhem (consisting of: Dr. Teeth (vocals, keyboards), Animal (drums), Floyd Pepper (bass, vocals), Janice (Guitar, vocals), Zoot (saxophone), and Lips (trumpet), Dr. Bunsen Honeydew and Beaker, The Swedish Chef, Statler and Waldorf, Sam Eagle, Rizzo the Rat, Pepe the King Prawn and Walter.

As well as The Muppet Show, the characters are popular for their appearances on Sesame Street and Fraggle Rock; and also feature in Sam and Friends, The Jimmy Dean Show, The Jim Henson Hour, Muppets Tonight, Bear in the Big Blue House, Statler and Waldorf: From the Balcony, The Muppets, and The Muppets Mayhem. An adult-oriented segment, The Land of Gorch, was a regular feature in the first season of Saturday Night Live. Guest stars on Saturday Night Live occasionally include both the Muppets and Sesame Street characters, as well as Muppet likenesses of real people; these likenesses appear recurrently in early episodes of The Muppet Show and on Sesame Street, and appear occasionally on other series such as 30 Rock.

Following Disney's acquisition of the Muppets, puppets created by the Jim Henson Company are no longer referred to as Muppets. Puppets created by Jim Henson's Creature Shop, including those in Labyrinth and The Dark Crystal, have never been considered Muppets, as they are generally more complex in design and performance than regular Muppets. At Henson's suggestion, the Star Wars character Yoda was originally performed by Frank Oz, and has been loosely described as a Muppet in media and reference works; he is not, however, and Henson otherwise had no involvement in the character's conception.

== Design and performance ==
From 1962 to 1978, Don Sahlin was the primary designer and builder of the Muppets and was described by Henson as "the man most responsible for the look of the Muppets." Sahlin's designs are often recognizable for their spheroid heads partially bisected to create large mouths; several characters designed by Sahlin include Rowlf the Dog, Bert and Ernie, Grover, and Cookie Monster.

The majority of the Muppets are designed as hand puppets, with several characters utilizing rods. Common design elements of the Muppets include flexible faces with wide mouths and large protruding eyes. Most of the Muppets are molded or carved out of various types of foam and covered with any felt-like material. The characters may represent humans, anthropomorphic characters, realistic animals, animate inanimate objects, robots, extraterrestrial or mythical creatures, or other forms of abstract characters.

The Muppets are distinguished from ventriloquist dummies, which are usually animated only in the head and face, in that their arms or other features are also animated. They are also generally made of softer material. They are presented as being independent of the puppeteer, officially known as a "Muppet performer", who is usually hidden behind a set or outside of the camera frame. Using the camera frame to this advantage was an innovation of the Muppets. Prior to this, a stage was used to mask the performers, as would be the case in a live performance. Sometimes, they are seen full-bodied; in most cases, invisible strings are used to manipulate these puppets, with vocals added at a later point. Performers often use dollies to mimic walking.

Since 2006, Disney has contracted Puppet Heap to produce and maintain newer models of the Muppets. During most performances, the performer holds the character above their head or in front of their body, with one hand operating the head and mouth and the other manipulating the hands and arms, either with two separate control rods or – in the case of "live-hand" Muppets – wearing the hands similarly to gloves. One consequence of this design is that most of the Muppets are left-handed, with the performer using their right hand to operate the head while operating the arm with their left hand.

For more complex Muppets, several performers may operate a single character, with the performer controlling the mouth usually voicing the character. As technology has advanced, the Jim Henson team and other performers have developed several means to operate the Muppets for film and television; these include the use of suspended rigs, internal motors, remote manipulators, and computer-enhanced and superimposed images. Creative use of different technologies has allowed for scenes in which the Muppets appear to exhibit complex movements wholly independently of the performer.

In his 2008 book Street Gang, author Michael Davis wrote that the characters tend to develop "organically", alluding to the performers taking up to a year to develop their characters and voices. They are also "test-driven, passed around from one Henson troupe member to another in the hope of finding the perfect human-Muppet match". When interacting with them, children believed that Muppets were living beings, even when the performers were present.

=== Muppet performers ===
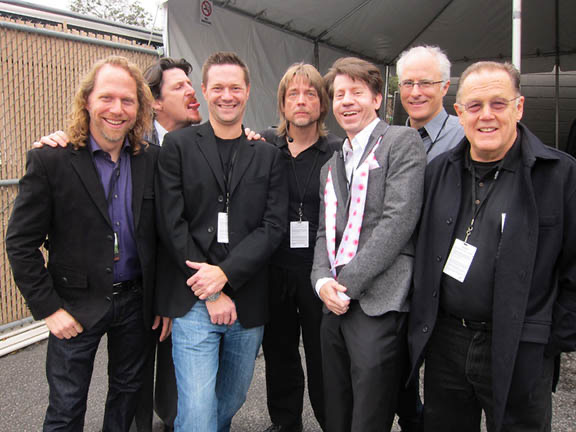
Main cast of Muppet performers in 2012: (from left to right) Peter Linz, Bill Barretta, Matt Vogel, Steve Whitmire, Eric Jacobson, David Rudman and Dave Goelz

Cast performers
Performer	Principal characters
Bill Barretta	Rowlf the Dog, Pepe the King Prawn, Dr. Teeth, Bobo the Bear, The Swedish Chef, Johnny Fiama, Big Mean Carl, Bubba the Rat, Howard Tubman, Mahna Mahna
Dave Goelz	Gonzo, Dr. Bunsen Honeydew, Zoot, Beauregard, Waldorf, Chip
Eric Jacobson	Miss Piggy, Fozzie Bear, Animal, Sam Eagle, Marvin Suggs, The Newsman
David Rudman	Scooter, Janice, Beaker
Peter Linz	Walter, Statler, Lips, Joe the Legal Weasel, Robin the Frog, Link Hogthrob, Foo-Foo
Matt Vogel	Kermit the Frog, Uncle Deadly, Floyd Pepper, Camilla the Chicken, Constantine, Crazy Harry, Dr. Julius Strangepork, Lew Zealand, Pops, Sweetums, 80's Robot
Bradley Freeman, Jr.	Rizzo the Rat, Bean Bunny

The Muppets have been operated and performed by a cast of puppeteers collectively known as the "Muppet performers", a troupe established by Jim and Jane Henson in 1955. In the Muppets' early years, Jim and Jane Henson were the sole performers. Jane retired from performing in 1961 to focus on raising their children, after which Jim Henson began recruiting additional puppeteers. That same year, he met Frank Oz, who would become one of the core members of the Muppet performing team.

Although interested, Oz initially declined due to his young age and high school commitments, and instead recommended Jerry Juhl, a colleague from the Vagabond Puppet Theater in Oakland, California. Upon graduating, Oz joined the troupe in August 1963, which at the time included Henson, Juhl, and Muppet designer Don Sahlin. By the time The Muppet Show entered production in 1976, the principal group of performers had expanded to include Henson, Oz, Jerry Nelson, Dave Goelz, and Richard Hunt. Juhl transitioned to serve as head writer for the series. Steve Whitmire joined in the third season in 1978. From The Muppet Show onward, additional puppeteers such as Kevin Clash, Kathryn Mullen, Louise Gold, Karen Prell, Fran Brill, Caroll Spinney, and Brian Henson performed minor characters and assisted the main performers. Many of these puppeteers contributed across other Henson-related productions, including Sesame Street and Fraggle Rock.

Jim Henson, Hunt, and Nelson continued performing until their deaths in 1990, 1992, and 2012, respectively. Goelz, Whitmire, and Bill Barretta—who joined the main cast of performers in the mid-1990s—assumed several of Henson's characters. Whitmire also inherited the role of Beaker, and Nelson that of Statler, both originally performed by Hunt. The remainder of Hunt's characters were left without regular performers until David Rudman assumed several of them during the 2000s. Oz continued performing until his retirement from puppeteering in 2000, with Eric Jacobson succeeding him in his characters beginning in 2002. At Nelson's behest, Matt Vogel gradually began performing his characters in 2008. Peter Linz joined the main cast in 2011, debuting the role of Walter in The Muppets.

Whitmire was dismissed from the troupe in 2016, with Vogel cast as Kermit the Frog in 2017. Most of Whitmire's remaining characters were subsequently recast among the existing performers, primarily to Linz. In 2025, Bradley Freeman, Jr. joined the cast, taking over Whitmire's Rizzo the Rat and Bean Bunny characters in the 50th anniversary special for The Muppet Show in 2026. As of the present, the Muppets are performed by a core ensemble of seven principal puppeteers: Goelz, Barretta, Jacobson, Vogel, Rudman, Linz, and Freeman, with the occasional ensemble of "additional" Muppet performers that includes Julianne Buescher, Tyler Bunch, Stephanie D'Abruzzo, Alice Dinnean, Bruce Lanoil, Leslie Carrara-Rudolph, Drew Massey, Mike Quinn, and Michelan Sisti.

== Media ==
=== Discography ===
On September 17, 2002, Rhino Records released The Muppet Show: Music, Mayhem, and More, a compilation album of music from The Muppet Show and subsequent film releases. With John Denver, John Denver and the Muppets: A Christmas Together was produced and released in 1979.

Under Disney ownership, The Muppets albums have been released by Walt Disney Records, including new album releases and album reissues, such as The Muppet Christmas Carol in 2005 and The Muppet Movie in 2013. Legal music publishing rights to Muppet songs are administered by Fuzzy Muppet Songs and Mad Muppet Melodies, imprints of Disney Music Publishing.

=== Theme parks ===
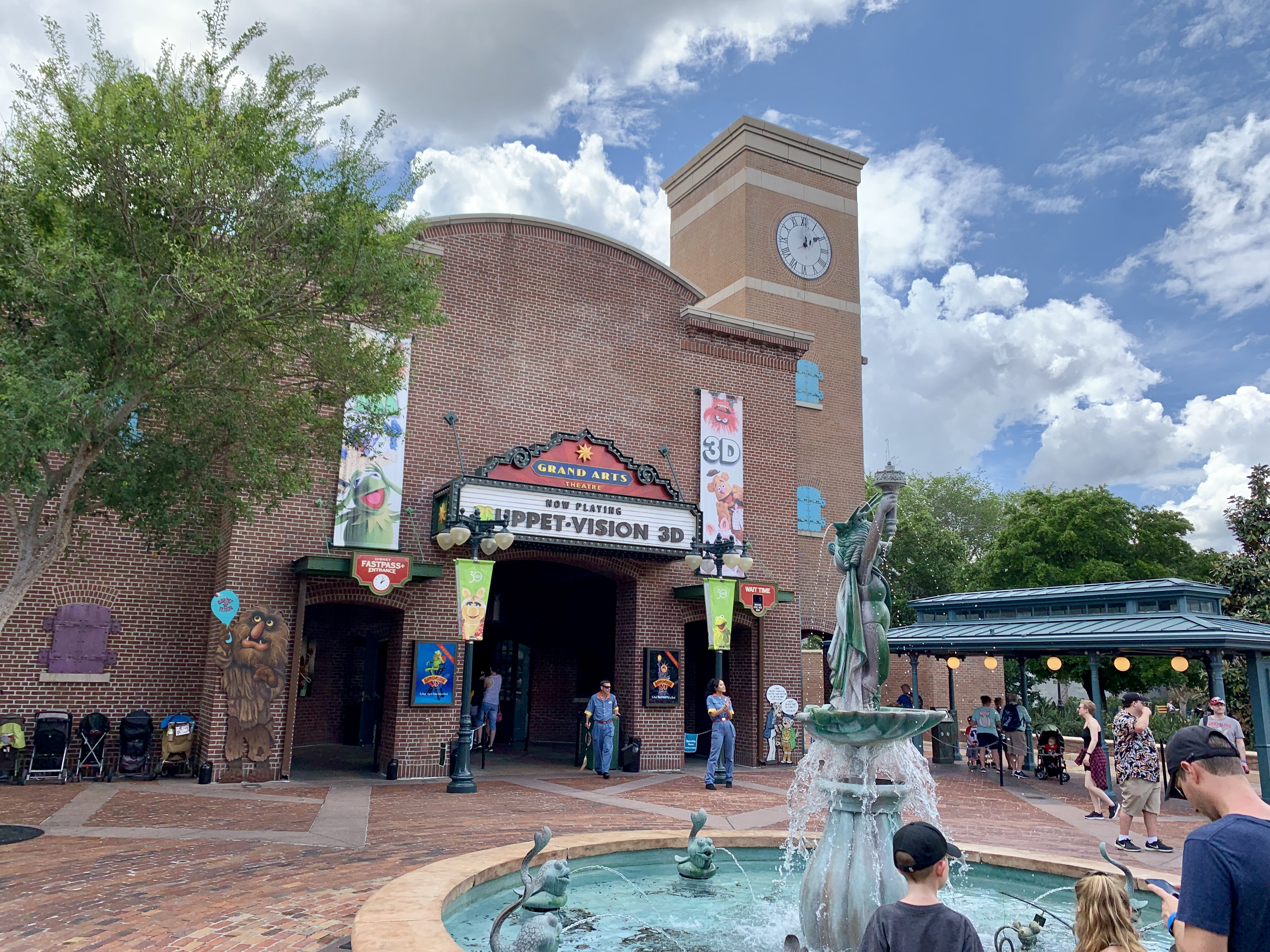
Muppet*Vision 3D operated at Disney's Hollywood Studios from 1991 to 2025

Similar to other Disney characters, the Muppets appear at Disney theme parks, having first appeared at Walt Disney World Resort in 1990. Their first featured attraction, Here Come the Muppets, was a live stage show that opened shortly after Jim Henson's death and ran at Disney's Hollywood Studios (known at that time as Disney-MGM Studios) for a year. Muppet*Vision 3D, a 4D film attraction that also featured Audio-Animatronics characters, opened at Disney's Hollywood Studios on May 16, 1991. It is Henson's final directorial effort. Muppet*Vision 3D subsequently opened at Disney California Adventure, on February 8, 2001; this version closed in 2014. The original version of Muppet*Vision 3D at Disney's Hollywood Studios closed on June 8, 2025.

The Muppets also were featured in The Muppets Present...Great Moments in American History at the Magic Kingdom from 2016 to 2020, and the Muppet Mobile Lab at Epcot in 2007. The latter attraction is a free-roving vehicle with Audio-Animatronics figures of Bunsen Honeydew and Beaker. As part of Disney's Living Character Initiative, it premiered at Disney California Adventure and later made appearances at Epcot and Hong Kong Disneyland.

In 2010, the Muppets were the face of the "Give a Day, Get a Disney Day" charity campaign. Kermit, Miss Piggy, and Sweetums appeared in daily parades at Disneyland and Magic Kingdom. The Muppets appeared in television and print ads for the campaign and were featured prominently on the campaign's web site.

The Disney Parks have released numerous collector pins featuring the Muppets since 2004. These include Limited Edition pins, Hidden Mickey pin collections, mystery pin sets, 2008 pin sets promoting The Muppets, cast lanyard pins, and assorted individual rack pins. Over 100 pins displaying the characters have been released overall.

In November 2024, it was announced that the Rock 'n' Roller Coaster Starring Aerosmith attraction at Disney's Hollywood Studios would be re-themed to the Muppets. The re-themed attraction opened as Rock 'n' Roller Coaster Starring The Muppets with The Electric Mayhem as the marquee artist on May 26, 2026.

In 2025, the Muppets began appearing in a preshow for World of Color Happiness! at Disney California Adventure, in celebration of the 70th anniversary of both the Muppets and Disneyland.

=== Publishing ===
Jim Henson's Muppets comic strip title logo that appears in the Sunday strips

Among other print media, the Muppets have featured in comics since the 1980s. An eponymous comic strip by Guy and Brad Gilchrist first ran on September 21, 1981, in over 500 daily newspapers, six months after The Muppet Show ended its five-year run. By the end of its run in 1986, the comic strip was seen in over 660 newspapers worldwide. Many of the strips were compiled in various book collections. Special strips were also created in color, exclusively for issues of Muppet Magazine.

Muppet Magazine was published from 1983 to 1989. The magazine was presented as being run by the Muppets themselves and included such features as celebrity interviews and comic stories.

The only Muppets film adapted as a comic book was The Muppets Take Manhattan. The comic book series was adapted by Marvel Comics in 1984, as the 68-page story in Marvel Super Special issue #32. The adaptation was later re-printed into three limited series issues, released under Marvel's Star Comics imprint (November 1984 – January 1985).

In the wake of Muppet Babies' success, Star Comics adapted the series into a bi-monthly title, of which 26 issues were produced.

The final issue of Disney Adventures, released in 2007, included a one-page strip by Roger Langridge. In 2009, Boom! Studios began publishing a series of comic books based on The Muppet Show, written and illustrated by Langridge. After two mini-series, an ongoing series, The Muppet Show Comic Book, was published for eleven issues. Additionally, Boom! Studios published fairy tale adaptations centered on the Muppets. In 2012, the Langridge series was transferred to Marvel Comics, which released an omnibus edition in 2013.

=== Video games ===
The first video game in the franchise was Kermit's Electronic Storymaker, which was released in 1984 for the Commodore 64. In 1989, Muppet Adventure: Chaos at the Carnival, was released by Hi Tech Expressions for the Apple II, Commodore 64, and MS-DOS, the following year it was ported by the Nintendo Entertainment System (NES) in 1990. In 1996, Activision and in association with Jim Henson Interactive released the CD-ROM game, Muppet Treasure Island (on which the film of the same name was based) for Windows 95. Later in 1996, Starwave released The Muppet CD-ROM: Muppets Inside, the second CD-ROM game was advertised for a January release, and available in stores beginning in March. In April 2000, Take-Two Interactive released the platform game under the title Jim Henson's Muppets for the Game Boy Color. In October 2000, Midway Games released the two Muppet video games, Muppet RaceMania and Muppet Monster Adventure for the PlayStation console. On April 18, 2002, TDK Mediactive acquired the rights to The Muppets games, and released two video games, The Muppets: On With the Show! (2002) and Spy Muppets: License to Croak (2003) for the Game Boy Advance and Muppets Party Cruise (2003) for the PlayStation 2 and GameCube consoles. In 2014, Virtual Toys released The Muppets Movie Adventures for PS Vita. The mobile game Disney Magic Kingdoms, developed by Gameloft, includes characters and attractions based on The Muppets franchise during limited time contents.

== In popular culture ==
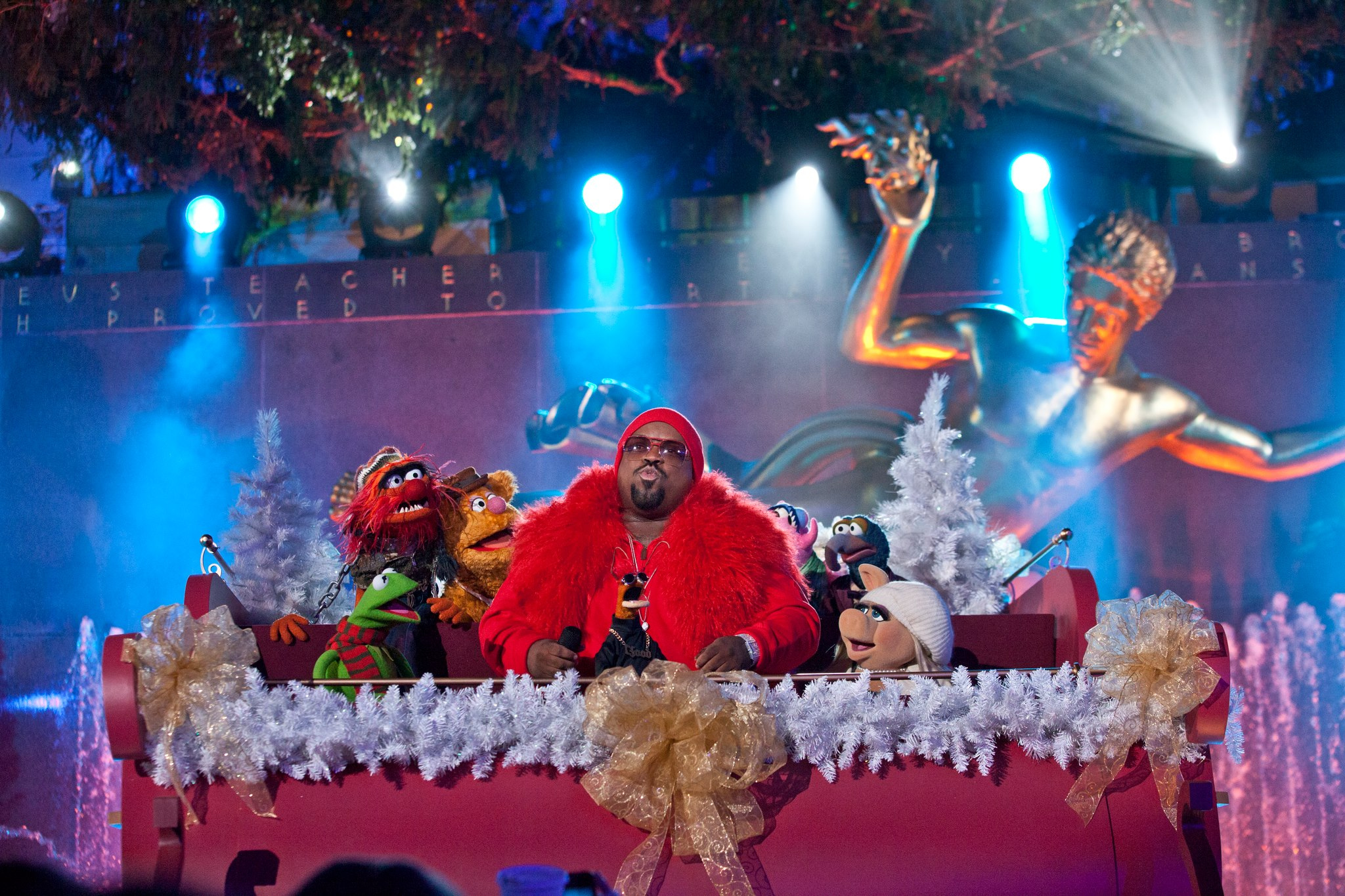
The Muppets performing with CeeLo Green at Rockefeller Center in 2012

The Muppets' prevalence in popular culture is such that the characters have become regarded as celebrities in their own right. The Muppets have a collective star on the Hollywood Walk of Fame, with Kermit having been previously individually inducted in 2002. The characters have appeared at the Academy Awards and Emmy Awards; made cameo appearances in films including Rocky III, An American Werewolf in London, and Mr. Magorium's Wonder Emporium; and have been interviewed on the news magazine 60 Minutes.

Kermit was interviewed by Jon Stewart on The Daily Show; was a guest host on The Tonight Show, Jimmy Kimmel Live!, Extreme Makeover: Home Edition, America's Funniest Home Videos, and an April Fools' Day edition of Larry King Live; and has served as grand marshal of the Tournament of Roses Parade. The characters also appeared on The Cosby Show and The Torkelsons, among other sitcoms. The music video for Weezer's "Keep Fishin'" is aesthetically based on The Muppet Show and consists of the band interacting with the characters.

On September 28, 2005, the United States Postal Service released a Jim Henson and the Muppets postage stamp series. The Muppets also appeared on Dick Clark's New Year's Rockin' Eve on December 31, 2007, in which Kermit and other characters presented segments following advertising breaks. After one such segment, with Kermit in Times Square, co-host Ryan Seacrest thanked "Kerms" for his assistance. Miss Piggy has appeared as a guest on The Late Late Show with Craig Ferguson, and Kermit appeared on Hollywood Squares and as one of the celebrity commentators on VH1's I Love documentary series. The Muppets, as well as the title character of Bear in the Big Blue House, have made frequent appearances on The Jerry Lewis MDA Labor Day Telethon.

On July 25, 2007, the Center for Puppetry Arts in Atlanta announced plans for the Jim Henson Wing, which would house up to 700 retired Muppet characters. The wing, featuring films, sketches, and other materials from the Jim Henson Company archives, was set to open in 2012 but eventually opened as a gallery within the Worlds of Puppetry exhibition at the Center in November 2015.

Muppet-like characters star in the Broadway musical Avenue Q, the concept of which is a parody of Sesame Street. The Peter Jackson film Meet the Feebles, a satire on the television industry, is largely reminiscent of The Muppet Show. A Kermit the Frog stuffed toy rigged to spray fake vomit was a recurring joke on Late Night with Conan O'Brien, and the Muppets were frequently preempted at the beginning of episodes of You Can't Do That on Television. The sitcom series Greg the Bunny centered on sentient hand puppets working on a Muppet-like children's show. Among other examples, television series such as The Simpsons, Family Guy, The West Wing, and Robot Chicken have referenced the Muppets.

The term "muppet" is commonly used in Ireland, Britain, and Australasia to refer to a stupid or ineffectual person.

The Muppets were featured in the 2026 FIFA World Cup Final half-time show. It was thought to have been seen by around 2 billion people.
