= Man or Muppet =

- Gary and Walter, playing piano and singing alongside their respective counterparts.

Song by Jason Segel and Walter (Peter Linz)

from the album The Muppets
- Published: Fuzzy Muppet Songs
- Released: November 22, 2011
- Length: 2:58
- Label: Walt Disney
- Songwriter: Bret McKenzie
- Producers: Bret McKenzie; Mickey Petralia

Music video
- "Man or Muppet" on YouTube

"Man or Muppet" is a song from Walt Disney Pictures' 2011 musical comedy film The Muppets, written by singer-songwriter Bret McKenzie. Performed by the film's main characters, Gary (Jason Segel) and Walter (Peter Linz), the song also features Bill Barretta and Jim Parsons portraying the contrasting identities of Gary and Walter, respectively. The song was released by Walt Disney Records on November 22, 2011, as part of the film's original soundtrack.

"Man or Muppet" won Best Original Song at the 84th Academy Awards and the Sierra Award for Best Song. It was also nominated for Best Song Written for Visual Media at the 55th Annual Grammy Awards, Best Original Song at the 16th Satellite Awards and Best Song at the 17th Critics' Choice Awards, in which two other songs from the film, "Life's a Happy Song" and "Pictures in My Head", were also nominated, with the former winning.

== Context ==
In the film, the song is performed by Gary (Jason Segel), Walter (Peter Linz), a Muppet form of Gary (Bill Barretta), and Walter's human form (Jim Parsons).

The song is a piece that reflects Gary and Walter questioning what their true identities are. Through the course of the film, Gary is oblivious to the desires of his longtime girlfriend, Mary (Amy Adams), and instead offers to sacrifice his time to assist the rest of the Muppets return to fame. This leads to a conflict between him and a distraught Mary, who returns to her home in Smalltown without him. Meanwhile, his younger brother, Walter, despite his respect and admiration for the Muppets, experiences an identity crisis as he comes to terms with the dilemma of having to choose between becoming part of the Muppets—which has been his lifelong dream—or continuing his ordinary life alongside Gary and Mary.

During this song, Gary and Walter see alternate versions of themselves—while wandering the streets, Gary sees himself as a Muppet in a shop window and trolley, and Walter sees himself as a human (Parsons) in a circle of mirrors inside the Muppet Theatre. At one point, Gary and Walter (each with their respective counterpart) come together in an abstract, recondite musical setting, dressed in white tuxedos and playing pianos facing each other. At the song's conclusion, both characters ultimately accept who they really are; Gary declares himself a "Man" (but "a Muppet of a man") and Walter a "Muppet" (but "a very manly Muppet"). Gary and Mary are later seen reconciling after Gary goes back to Smalltown and apologizes to her.

== Background ==
I think everyone has had that crisis at some point, trying to figure out whether they are a man or a Muppet ... I like the idea of people having that crisis, driving around, trying to figure it out.

— Bret McKenzie on the meaning of "Man or Muppet"

The film's writers, Nicholas Stoller and Segel, informed McKenzie that he had to avoid alluding to the term "puppet", stating that the Muppet characters view themselves as actual people, and never as sentient puppet figures.

McKenzie cited power ballads written by artists such as Eric Carmen and Harry Nilsson as inspiration for the song's tone. He also stated that the main reason for the song's inclusion in the film was to have the characters resolve the problem of coming to accept their true selves.

Michael Cera and Paul Rudd were considered for the role of Walter's alter-ego. The part was eventually given to Jim Parsons, who described it as "the role of a lifetime".

== Reception ==
After receiving the Oscar nomination, McKenzie admitted that he never expected it to be nominated and described his experience in writing the lyrics, stating that he "really wanted it to be hilarious and beautiful" and that the song itself is "sincere but ridiculous".

"Man or Muppet" was the third song from a Muppet film to be nominated for an Academy Award but the first to win, the previous nominations being "Rainbow Connection" (from The Muppet Movie) and "The First Time It Happens" (from The Great Muppet Caper). It is also the twelfth song from a Disney film to win for Best Original Song; (Note: "When You Wish Upon a Star" (from Pinocchio), "Zip-a-Dee-Doo-Dah" (from Song of the South), "Chim Chim Cher-ee" (from Mary Poppins), "Under the Sea" (from The Little Mermaid), "Beauty and the Beast" (from Beauty and the Beast), "A Whole New World" (from Aladdin), "Can You Feel the Love Tonight" (from The Lion King), "Colors of the Wind" (from Pocahontas), "You'll Be in My Heart" (from Tarzan), "If I Didn't Have You" (from Monsters, Inc.), and "We Belong Together" (from Toy Story 3).) Since then two more songs from Disney films also won for Best Original Song. (Note: "Let It Go" (from Frozen) and "Remember Me" (from Coco).)

=== Accolades ===
Awards
Award	Category	Result
Academy Awards	Best Original Song	Won
Critics' Choice Movie Awards	Best Song	Nominated
Georgia Film Critics Association Awards	Best Original Song	Won
Grammy Awards	Best Song Written for Visual Media	Nominated
Houston Film Critics Society Awards	Best Original Song	Nominated
Las Vegas Film Critics Society Awards	Best Song	Won
Phoenix Film Critics Society Awards	Best Original Song	Nominated
Satellite Awards	Best Original Song	Nominated

== Chart performance ==
Chart (2012)	Peak position
UK Singles (The Official Charts Company)	121

== Music video ==
On December 20, 2011, Walt Disney Records produced a music video for the song on their Disney Music YouTube channel. The video is similar to that of what is seen in the film during the song's duration, however there are a few other scenes from the film spliced in throughout the video. The video has been aired on Disney Channel and Disney XD.

On February 24, 2012, Walt Disney Records re-published the music video in high-definition on The Muppets Studio' official YouTube channel.

== See also ==
- The Muppets: Original Soundtrack
