= Looney Tunes Galactic Sports =

2015 video game

- Developer: Virtual Toys
- Publisher: Sony Computer Entertainment
- Director: Jesús Iglesias
- Designers: Santiago Cobo; Alejo Silos; Tobias Heussner
- Programmers: Raúl Mellado; Macarena Mey; Álvaro García; Daniel García-Arista
- Artist: Sonia León
- Composer: Victor David Peral
- Series: Looney Tunes
- Engine: Unity
- Platform: PlayStation Vita
- Release: PAL: May 27, 2015
- Genre: Sports
- Modes: Single-player, multiplayer

Looney Tunes Galactic Sports is a 2015 sports video game developed by Virtual Toys and published by Sony Computer Entertainment for the PlayStation Vita. Based on The Looney Tunes Show, the game was released only in PAL territories.

== Gameplay ==
Tasmanian Devil takes on Yosemite Sam in a boxing match. Boxing is the only sport of the collection that is played from a first-person perspective.

Players take control of one of six characters from the Looney Tunes franchise: Bugs Bunny, Daffy Duck, Porky Pig, Tasmanian Devil, Yosemite Sam and Wile E. Coyote (although all besides Bugs Bunny have to be unlocked through leveling up via experience points earned by playing), and participate in several sports-themed minigames. Each character has unique statistics that alter their play style; for example, some have a higher speed than others.

Six games are ultimately available for play, although initially only racing is playable. In 'Space Race', players race three other participants around a course with the aim of finishing as fast as possible, albeit without the ability to control one's speed or acceleration. Throughout the lap, obstacles will appear on the track that require a switching to an adjacent lane, jumping or sliding to safely avoid. 'Space Golf' is a one-hole golf game, although featuring obstacles on the course. Archery makes use of the Vita's gyroscope, with the player physically moving their handheld console to aim at targets. ‘Trap Shooter’ is an on-rails shooter, similar in execution to Space Harrier. Boxing is also present, as is 'Aquatic Sport', a water-based game where players must collect and bring balls located around a swimming pool to their own goal to bank points while also attacking other competitors; if attacked, all held balls will be dropped, with the ultimate objective of collecting and returning 10 balls to your goals. Thematically, all sports are played on a Looney Tunes interpretation of the planet Mars, in competitions hosted by Marvin the Martian.

The sports can be played across several modes. In the Galactic Games mode, players partake in a series of tournaments, and must rank in the top three in order to progress. There are six tournaments in total with each varying in difficulty. Upon completion of the final tournament, Marvin's Quest is unlocked, a series of challenges across each sport that players are able to complete, as well as the ability to freely select any individual sport for replay via a quick play menu. While participating in a game, coins are scattered throughout the arena, which can be collected for use in the ACME shop. The store features gadgets that can be bought for use in each of the six sports. For example, an anvil may be purchased for use in 'Space Race', which can subsequently be dropped on other racers for use as an attack. Additional items are unlocked as players progress in level. Also throughout sports are the letters A, C, M, and E; collecting all four will double the player's final coin total.

The game features a competitive multiplayer mode, where up to four players can compete against each other, although some games such as boxing are capped at two competitors. Multiplayer is only available over ad hoc play and is thus limited to systems that are in close physical proximity.

Because the game's menu's are only responsive to touch screen controls, and some sports make use of physical characteristics of the Vita, the game is not compatible with the PlayStation TV.

== Release ==
Developed by Spanish game studio Virtual Toys, the title was announced on April 9, 2015, in a post on the European PlayStation Blog, revealing some gameplay elements with a release date for later that year, although no specific date was given. At the time of the announcement, the game was only confirmed for release in Europe, with development being still ongoing in the late stages. The title ultimately quietly released on May 27, 2015, to little fanfare. Physical copies were produced for sale in Australia and Europe. Nine languages are included: English, Spanish, French, German, Italian, Portuguese, Dutch, Greek, and Russian.

The game was the second in a trio of family-friendly licensed Vita exclusive games in a partnership between Virtual Toys and Sony. The Muppets Movie Adventures released the previous year, while Phineas and Ferb: Day of Doofenshmirtz followed later in 2015.

== Reception ==
Publications generally welcomed the kid-friendly atmosphere but were critical to the game's lack of long-lasting appeal and the sub-par quality of some of the games.

In a 6.5/10 review for the Spanish publication El Español's video game blog Vandal, Sara Borondo wrote that some games were enjoyable and praised the game's ability to capture the style and humor of the original cartoons, but criticized the long load times and some technical issues with respect to framerate drops. Digitally Downloaded commented that while some sports were fun, 'in the context of a game that was released to retail, even the better half of these games struggle to demonstrate their value...[the] game really isn't going to be remembered as the finest project Sony backed on its PlayStation Vita platform.' Ultimaley, they scored the game 2.5/5.

In May 2022, The Gamer placed Galactic Sports at #1 on its list of Looney Tunes games people probably did not know existed.
