= Walter (Muppet) =

Muppet character

- The Muppets character
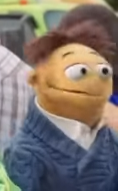
- First appearance: The Muppets (2011)
- Created by: Jason Segel; Nicholas Stoller
- Performed by: Peter Linz
- Portrayed by: Jim Parsons (human form)

In-universe information
- Species: Muppet human
- Gender: Male
- Family: Gary (brother); Mary (sister-in-law, once she marries Gary)
- Nationality: American

Walter is a Muppet character performed by Peter Linz. A character created for the 2011 film The Muppets in which he is one of the main protagonists, he has become a frequently-featured character in subsequent Muppet works, including the 2014 film sequel Muppets Most Wanted.

In his original film appearance, Walter, a lifelong fan of The Muppet Show, is a Muppet who was raised alongside his human older brother Gary, and comes to question his life goals after he is offered to join The Muppet Show; the Academy Award-winning song "Man or Muppet" is notably centered on Walter and Gary questioning their identities and how they belong to both humankind and muppetkind. The character was received positively by most critics and fans upon his debut, with praise for his storyline in The Muppets. Screen Rant's Ben Kendrick wrote, "Even Walter, despite being the new Muppet on the block, holds his own alongside his non-human friends, and will no doubt be a fan-favorite for years to come." E! referred to the addition of Walter as "an inspired choice". Betsy Sharkey of the Los Angeles Times said that Walter "is adorably insecure and a good addition to the house that Jim Henson built, which included so many iconic characters."

== Biography ==
During his adolescence in Smalltown, Walter frequently watched The Muppet Show, collecting memorabilia and finding the cast as a source of inspiration during his upbringing—which is why he often refers to himself as the "world’s biggest Muppet fan". While on vacation in Los Angeles, Walter assists the Muppets in regaining both their popularity with the public and control of their acquired studios from oil baron Tex Richman.

Later in the film, Walter starts to question whether he is man, which he was believed to be his entire life, or actually a Muppet, which was why he always felt a connection towards them. This emotion eventually leads him to sing the Academy Award-winning song, "Man or Muppet", where a human version of Walter is portrayed by Jim Parsons. The scene is pivotal to the character's arc as it resolves Walter's internal issues with himself. At the conclusion of the film, Walter deduces that he is a Muppet, adopts whistling as his talent and joins the group.

== Development ==
=== Characterization ===
In the process of conceptualizing Walter, Nicholas Stoller said; "We wanted a simple character, who was pure innocence and pure enthusiasm as an entry point for kids who aren't necessarily as familiar with The Muppets as their parents." Jason Segel, added: "He's a stand-in for me, a hardcore Muppet fan who wants to know what the hell happened to them." He also revealed a shared ambition with the character; "He sets out to make them as famous as they once were — which was sort of our goal in making this movie." Stoller and Segel's screenplay had described Walter as the adopted younger brother of Gary and had set Walter's age to be approximately 30 years old.

Much to the producers' surprise, The Walt Disney Company granted them the creative license to conceive a new Muppet without any initial marketing research, a technique Disney often employs when creating characters for their consumer products franchisees. Segel and Stoller, however, were responsible only for creating Walter's personality and character traits—his physical appearance was crafted by the Muppets Studio and Puppet Heap.

"I was sitting on their sofa, and I got the phone call, and I remember just kicking my legs in the air and screaming like a little girl... it's just an absolute dream come true."

— Peter Linz on receiving the role.

Peter Linz came to the producers' attention after a screenplay read-through, where he assisted fellow Muppet performer Eric Jacobson. The producers called Linz, asking if he were interested in auditioning for the role. Linz, however, did not initially win over the film's producers, and he was asked to audition again. During his second audition, Linz was told to emulate actor Michael Cera in his demeanor, because the producers wanted Walter to be quiet and shy, similar to the way Cera acts. Linz received the role after completing his second audition, where he improvised dialogue with Segel and performed several music duets, including "Love Will Keep Us Together". As Walter's characterization became more defined, Linz identified a comparative bond between him and Walter; "The character of Walter hits really close to home for me. I’ve always been an enormous Muppet fan who dreamed of one day working with the Muppets, and that’s basically who Walter is." Producer Todd Lieberman remarked, "The emotional core of the movie is Walter. The idea is that he's not comfortable where he is now but he ends up finding a place where he's comfortable at. That's a really great lesson."

=== Design ===
In the screenplay for The Muppets, Stoller and Segel described Walter as having the feel of "an old dishrag" that wore a blue suit. The writers stated that they wanted Walter to be small, because even though he was an adult, he needed to feel like he was "out of place in the human world." Walter's actual height has been recorded as being 18 inches tall. Paul Andrejco, president of Puppet Heap, showed the producers 14 different iterations of the basic puppet, each of them different in size and shape. Andrejco and the producers had to choose from 25 different possibilities for color and texture, ranging from "pink and scruffy to orange-y speckly to flat gray". Lieberman spoke about how Walter couldn't be a joke, and said, "At the end of the movie, you want to shed a tear for him when he finds his place."

== Appearances ==
Walter also appeared with the rest of the Muppets on several promotional posters and images. He also appeared several times to promote the film, including appearing on Late Night with Jimmy Fallon, along with Jason Segel. Walter appeared as part of the Muppets ensemble in Cee Lo Green's "All I Need Is Love" in 2012. He also appeared in Kirk Scroggs’ “Tales of a Sixth-Grade Muppet” book series.

=== Filmography ===
- The Muppets (2011)
- Lady Gaga and the Muppets Holiday Spectacular (2013) (TV)
- Muppets Most Wanted (2014)
- Disney Drive-On with The Muppets (2014) (Web)
- The Muppets (2015) (TV) (Presentation Pilot Only)
- The Muppets Take the Bowl (2017)
- The Muppets Take the O2 (2018)
- Muppets Now (2020)
- Muppets Haunted Mansion (2021)
