= Matt Vogel =

Matt Vogel may refer to:

- Matt Vogel (swimmer) (born 1957), American Olympic swimmer
- Matt Vogel (puppeteer) (born 1970), American puppeteer for The Muppets and Sesame Street
