= Voluntears =

Disney charitable organization

Voluntears (styled VoluntEARS) is a charitable organization made up of Disney cast members who donate their time to helping charities and service organizations in their communities around the world. It is part of the Disney Worldwide Outreach Program.

The program has already reached and served over 200 cities, 47 states, and 24 countries, spread out over six different continents. By tailoring volunteer opportunities to the volunteer's certain skills, volunteers are each assigned to specific volunteer work which is aligned to their skills and interests. Voluntears' projects mainly focus on helping families and children. Their secondary focus is to create projects which are aimed at the support of education, health, preserving the environment, arts, social service initiatives and military outreach.

== History ==
In 1983 at Disneyland, cast members wanted to give something back to the local Orange County, California area. This led to Disney forming the "Disneyland Community Action Team" (DCAT). DCAT became involved with the Special Olympics, the Orangewood Children's Home, and other local charities. The corporate-wide VoluntEARS program was created from this initiative in 1992. Disneyland Paris's volunteer club, originally called "Club Bénévole", had the same intentions. In 2005, these shared intentions of different volunteer groups around the world was recognized and they decided to simultaneously adopt the name "VoluntEARS" for the organization.

In 2002, Disney established "Ears to You," a program that makes donations to charities based on an employee's VoluntEARS participation in that charity. EARS to You was created for the volunteers after their 8,446 hours of volunteer work in 2012 as a mark of appreciation on the behalf of the Walt Disney Company. This programme allowed volunteers to access opportunities online and be matched with the right one depending on their individual preferences and skill sets.

== Giving ==
- In 2006, the Voluntears program at the Walt Disney World Resort donated more than $22 million to Central Florida organizations and charities, along with 200,000 hours of service.
- In 2005, the program provided more than 442,000 hours of service and US$190 million to charities and services around the world.
- In 2010, the volunteers had accomplished over 548,000 hours of volunteer work.
- In 2011, the Disneyland Resort Voluntear Projects provided over 85,000 hours of community service with a total of over 160 projects that year. In 2011, they also donated 500 pints of blood to the Providence Health Services and the American Red Cross, donated thousands of toys to the Toys for Tots Foundation and provided support to over 700 people during the Disney VoluntEARS holiday Adopt-A-Family program,
