= The Muppets (2011 film) =

2011 film by James Bobin

- Theatrical release poster
- Directed by: James Bobin
- Written by: Jason Segel; Nicholas Stoller
- Based on: Disney's Muppet characters and properties
- Produced by: David Hoberman; Todd Lieberman
- Starring: Jason Segel; Amy Adams; Chris Cooper; Rashida Jones
- Cinematography: Don Burgess
- Edited by: James Thomas
- Music by: Christophe Beck
- Production companies: Walt Disney Pictures; Mandeville Films
- Distributed by: Walt Disney Studios; Motion Pictures
- Release dates: November 4, 2011 (Savannah Film Festival); November 23, 2011 (United States)
- Running time: 102 minutes
- Country: United States
- Language: English
- Budget: $45 million
- Box office: $171.8 million

The Muppets is a 2011 American musical comedy film directed by James Bobin and written by Jason Segel and Nicholas Stoller. Produced by David Hoberman and Todd Lieberman, it is the seventh theatrical film featuring the Muppets. The film stars Segel, Amy Adams, Chris Cooper and Rashida Jones as well as Muppet performers Steve Whitmire, Eric Jacobson, Dave Goelz, Bill Barretta, David Rudman, Matt Vogel and Peter Linz. Bret McKenzie served as music supervisor, writing four of the film's five original songs, while Christophe Beck composed the score. In the film, devoted Muppet fan Walter, his human brother Gary and the latter's girlfriend Mary help Kermit the Frog reunite the disbanded Muppets in order to save the Muppet Theater from Tex Richman, a greedy oil magnate who plots to drill for oil on its former site.

Walt Disney Pictures announced development of a seventh Muppet film in March 2008, with Segel and Stoller as the screenwriters and Hoberman and Lieberman's Mandeville Films as co-producer. Conceived to serve as a creative reboot for the franchise after years of being largely out of the public eye following Disney's acquisition of the Muppets in 2004, Segel and Stoller intently addressed the Muppets' recent real-world lack of public exposure and fame in mainstream culture within the context of the film's story. As a result, The Muppets became the first film in the series to directly acknowledge The Muppet Show and reference plot points from previous Muppet films. Bobin was hired to direct in his feature-length debut in January 2010, and the film's supporting cast was filled out in October of the same year with the casting of Adams, Cooper and Jones. Filming took place from September 2010 to February 2011. The film was the first theatrical Muppets production to not star Frank Oz and Jerry Nelson performing their respective characters, although Nelson contributes an uncredited voice cameo. Instead, their roles are performed by Jacobson and Vogel, respectively, marking their theatrical feature film debut as those characters.

The Muppets premiered at the Savannah Film Festival on November 4, 2011, and was released theatrically in North America on November 23, by Walt Disney Studios Motion Pictures. The film was a critical and commercial success; it received universal acclaim for its humor, music, and revitalization of the Muppet characters, and grossed over $171 million worldwide on a budget of $45 million. The film won the Academy Award for Best Original Song for McKenzie's song "Man or Muppet", as well as earning BAFTA and Critic's Choice Awards nominations. A sequel, titled Muppets Most Wanted, was released on March 21, 2014.

== Plot ==
Walter, born a Muppet and a resident of Smalltown, is a lifelong fan of The Muppet Show. His human brother Gary intends to take his long-term girlfriend Mary on a vacation to Los Angeles. Mary wants Gary to propose to her, but feels his devotion to Walter distracts from their relationship.

The trio tour the rundown Muppet Studios, where Walter sneaks into Kermit the Frog's office. There, he overhears oil magnate Tex Richman and his henchmen, Uncle Deadly and Bobo the Bear, intending to buy the Muppet Theatre from Statler and Waldorf, who acknowledge that the Muppets could repurchase the theatre if they raised ten million dollars before their original contract expires. However, in private, Tex reveals his intent to drill for oil on the theatre's former site.

Walter informs Gary and Mary and they visit Kermit in his mansion, who realizes the Muppets would have to reunite and throw a telethon to raise the money. Though the Muppets have gone their separate ways, Kermit is convinced to reunite them. He convinces Fozzie Bear to join in, having been performing in Reno with the Moopets, a tribute band of uncouth Muppet impersonators. Gonzo, working as a plumbing magnate, at first refuses to join, but changes his mind. Animal attends a celebrity anger management clinic sponsored by Jack Black, who refuses to let him play the drums or even hear the mere mention of the instrument. The other various Muppets are recruited via "map montage".

The group travels to Paris to recruit Miss Piggy, who is an editor for Vogue Paris. She refuses to return, resulting in her Moopet equivalent, Miss Poogy, being hired. The Muppets pitch their telethon to several networks and CDE network executive Veronica Martin agrees to air their show if they gain a celebrity host and the Muppets rebuild the theatre; Piggy comes around afterwards and drives off Poogy. Needing enough acts to fill the telethon's two-hour timeslot, Kermit encourages Walter to find a talent. With Gary helping Walter, Mary goes sightseeing alone and eventually returns to Smalltown.

With time running out, a desperate Kermit tries to implore Tex to return the studio, but he refuses and then reveals that the Muppets' trademarks will be given to the Moopets. Kermit gives up, prompting Piggy to rally the other Muppets to kidnap Jack to be the host. Gary discovers Mary has left and returns to Smalltown.

The Muppets convince Kermit to participate in the telethon, which slowly gains both an audience and rising funds, thanks to telephone pledges from celebrity callers. Tex repeatedly attempts to sabotage the show, cutting the theatre's power, but the now-reconciled Gary and Mary arrive to restore it. A guilt-stricken Deadly betrays Tex and stops his second attempt at sabotage. Kermit and Piggy reconcile, leading the Muppets to perform a rendition of "Rainbow Connection". During this, Animal regains his love for drumming. Walter, with encouragement from Gary, performs a whistling act to pad the finale and earns a standing ovation.

Tex, refusing to accept defeat, deliberately crashes Kermit's car backwards into a telephone pole, cutting off the phone lines just a penny short of the quota—soon revealed that it was actually a large amount of money off due to faulty displaying—and evicts the Muppets from the theatre. Kermit resolves to "work [their] way up again" even though they no longer have the Muppets trademark or the theater. However, the group are met by adoring fans outside on Hollywood Boulevard, with Walter invited to join the Muppets as a regular, while Gary proposes to Mary. In a mid-credits scene, Tex, after being inadvertently struck in the head by Gonzo, willingly returns the theatre and trademark to the Muppets.

== Cast ==
=== Humans ===
- Jason Segel as Gary, Walter's human brother and a fan of the Muppets.
  - Gunnar Smith additionally portrays the character's six-year old self
  - Connor Gallagher additionally portrays the character's nine-year old self
  - Justin Marco additionally portrays the character's thirteen-year old self
- Amy Adams as Mary, a elementary school teacher and Gary's longtime girlfriend and later fiancée. She is also a very capable mechanic.
- Chris Cooper as Tex Richman, a greedy oil magnate who plots to demolish the Muppet Theater and drill for oil on its former site. He is unable to laugh until Gonzo gives him a head injury during the end credits.
- Rashida Jones as Veronica Martin, an executive at the CDE television network. Jones also puppeteered Trumpet Girl, whom she named "Dolores."
- Zach Galifianakis as Hobo Joe, a homeless man who is the first audience member of The Muppet Telethon. Joanna Newsom did his brief singing voice.
- Jim Parsons as a human caricature of Walter
- Ken Jeong as the host of the television program, Punch Teacher
- Alan Arkin as the Muppet Studios tour guide
- Bill Cobbs as a grandfather who watches The Muppet Telethon
- Eddie Pepitone as a postman
- Kristen Schaal as the Anger Management Group moderator.
- Eddie "Piolín" Sotelo as a Univision executive who turns down the Muppets' telethon pitch
- Donald Glover as a junior CDE executive, who informs Veronica of the sudden production-stopping of Punch Teacher due to a lawsuit from the Teachers' Society of America.
- Sarah Silverman as Pam, a restaurant greeter at Mel's Drive-In.
- Dahlia Wangort as a Fox executive who turns down the Muppets' telethon pitch
- Michael Albala as an NBC executive who turns down the Muppets' telethon pitch
- Aria Noelle Curzon as Marge, a waitress at Mel's Drive-In

=== Muppet performers ===
- Steve Whitmire as Kermit the Frog, Beaker, Statler, Rizzo the Rat, Link Hogthrob, Lips and the Newsman
- Eric Jacobson as Miss Piggy, Fozzie Bear, Animal, Sam Eagle and Marvin Suggs
- Dave Goelz as Gonzo, Dr. Bunsen Honeydew, Zoot, Beauregard, Waldorf and Kermoot
- Bill Barretta as Swedish Chef, Rowlf the Dog, Dr. Teeth, Pepe the Prawn, Bobo the Bear, Big Mean Carl, Mahna Mahna, Behemoth, Beautiful Day Monster, a Muppet caricature of Gary and a hobo
- David Rudman as Scooter, Janice, Miss Poogy, Wayne and Bobby Benson
- Matt Vogel as Sgt. Floyd Pepper, Camilla the Chicken, Sweetums, '80s Robot, Lew Zealand, Uncle Deadly, Roowlf, Crazy Harry and Janooce
- Peter Linz as Walter

Archival recordings of Goelz, Jim Henson, Frank Oz, Jerry Nelson and Richard Hunt can be heard in the film through The Muppet Show segments in the opening flashbacks. Nelson also makes an uncredited cameo appearance as the telethon's announcer, reprising his role from The Muppet Show. This would be the final time Nelson and his likeness would be used in a Muppets production before his death the following year.

=== Cameo appearances ===
- Jack Black (uncredited) as himself, Animal's court-appointed sponsor and unwilling celebrity host of The Muppet Telethon.
- Emily Blunt as Miss Piggy's receptionist at Vogue Paris. Blunt spoofs her prior role as Emily Charlton from the 2006 film The Devil Wears Prada.
- James Carville as himself, who assists in answering calls for the telethon.
- Leslie Feist as a Smalltown resident who appears during the "Life's a Happy Song" number.
- Whoopi Goldberg as herself, who assists in answering calls for the telethon.
- Selena Gomez as herself, who assists in answering calls for the telethon.
- Dave Grohl as Animool, a man dressed as Animal who is a member of the Moopets.
- Neil Patrick Harris as himself, who assists in answering calls for the telethon.
- Judd Hirsch as himself, who assists in answering calls for the telethon.
- John Krasinski as himself, who assists in answering calls for the telethon.
- Rico Rodriguez as himself, who assists in answering calls for the telethon.
- Mickey Rooney as a Smalltown resident who appears during the "Life's a Happy Song" sequence.

== Production ==
=== Development ===
In 2008, Jason Segel and Nicholas Stoller had pitched a concept for a new Muppets film to Walt Disney Studios executive vice-president of production Karen Falk, and they were offered a deal to develop their script, with David Hoberman and Todd Lieberman of Mandeville Films producing. The news became public in March 2008 when Variety first reported that Disney had signed a deal with Segel and Stoller, with Segel and Stoller writing the script and Stoller directing. In June 2008, Segel announced that he had turned in the first draft of his script and was hopeful that the film would live up to previous Muppets movies. Later in 2008, Stoller noted that he and Segel had written an "old school Muppets movie, where the Muppets have to put on a show to save the studio". In this same interview, Stoller also confirmed that they would get as many cameo appearances and guest stars as possible, and that Segel would play a ventriloquist.

Originally, the film was titled The Greatest Muppet Movie of All Time!!!, and an early leak of the script suggested that it would feature celebrity cameos by Adam Sandler, Bill Hader, Vince Vaughn, Jon Favreau, Christian Bale, Ben Stiller, Steve Carell, George Clooney, Jack Black, Jean-Claude Van Damme, Mel Brooks, Matt Damon, Anne Hathaway, Emily Blunt, Rachael Ray, Bob Saget, Lisa Lampanelli, Jeff Ross, and Charles Grodin. Another former title of the film was The Cheapest Muppet Movie Ever Made!, after an unused script written by Jerry Juhl back in 1985. Although early reports indicated that Stoller would direct the film, in January 2010 it was announced that James Bobin would direct the movie. In February 2010, additional details about the plot surfaced, indicating that the film would be about a villain that wanted to drill for oil underneath the old Muppet Theater, and that the only way to stop him would be to put on a show that draws ten million viewers. Reports from the summer of 2010 revealed that the production team had met with the creative heads at Pixar Animation Studios to fine tune the script. During the summer of 2010, it was announced that the film would be released on Christmas 2011, but in December 2010, the release date was moved to Thanksgiving 2011.

In October 2010, it was confirmed that Amy Adams, Chris Cooper and Rashida Jones would also be starring in the film. Over the next few months, several guest cameo announcements emerged, including, but not limited to Adam Sandler, Bill Hader, Emily Blunt, Ricky Gervais, Zach Galifianakis, Billy Crystal, Jack Black, Alan Arkin and Dave Grohl. However, Gervais, Crystal and several other cameos including Beth Broderick, Kathy Griffin, Ed Helms, Sterling Knight, Mila Kunis, Ben Stiller, Eric Stonestreet, Wanda Sykes Lady Gaga, Katy Perry and Danny Trejo were completely omitted from the film due to time constraints. Jim Parsons' cameo was kept as a secret by producers despite rumors that leaked on the Internet regarding his role in the film. In a March 2009 interview on The Late Late Show, Segel revealed that he had asked host Craig Ferguson to appear in the film, and at the time, he (Ferguson) had been the only person that had agreed. Ferguson was ultimately not given a role, for which he jokingly chastised Segel in a November 2011 interview. A cameo by the Sesame Street Muppet Elmo was written for a scene where the Muppets tried to get him to host their show only for lawyers to stop them from doing so, but the idea was rejected by Disney's attorneys and representatives from Sesame Workshop.

During the summer of 2010, Flight of the Conchords co-star Bret McKenzie flew to Los Angeles to serve as the music supervisor for The Muppets.

=== Filming ===
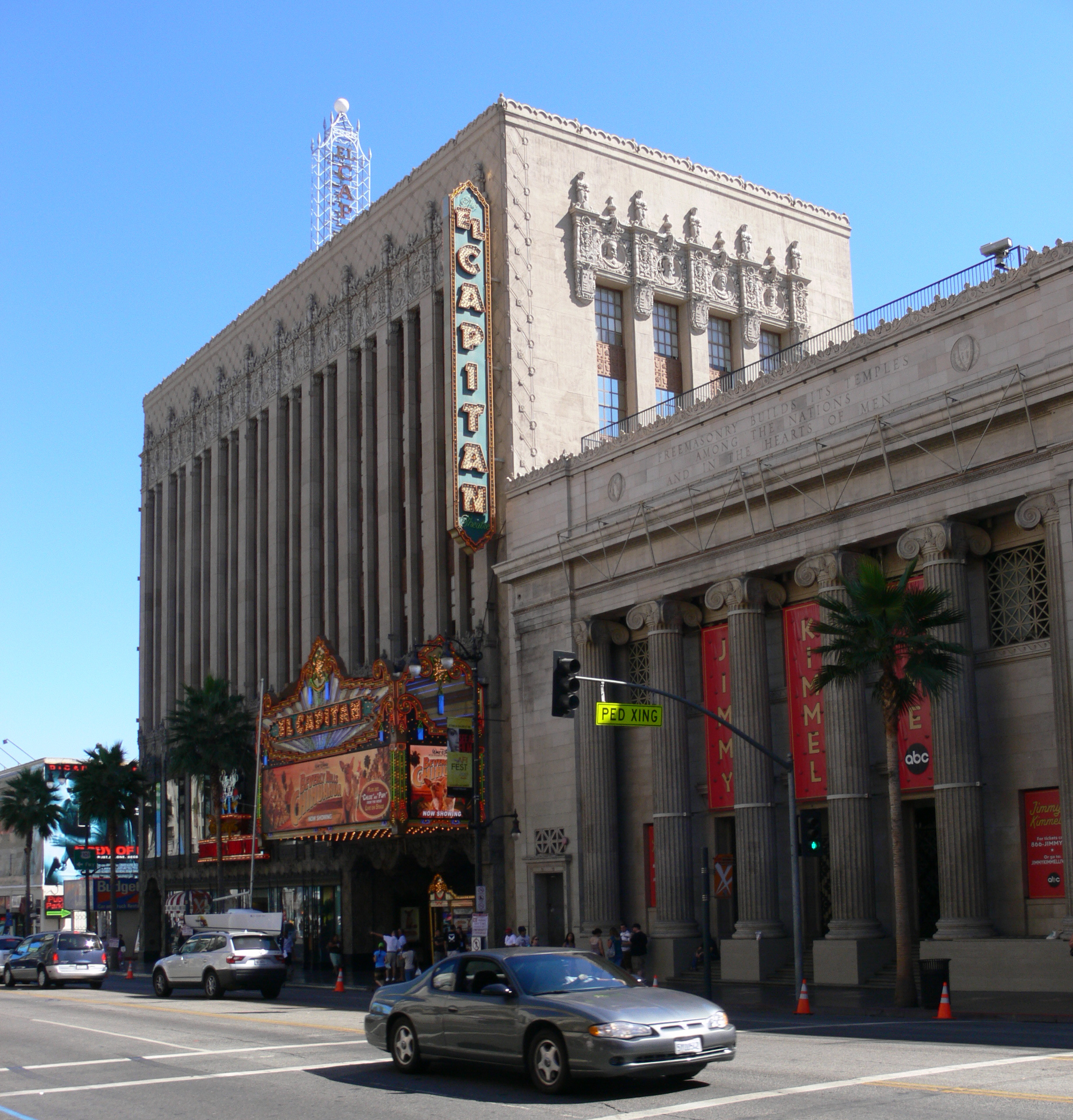
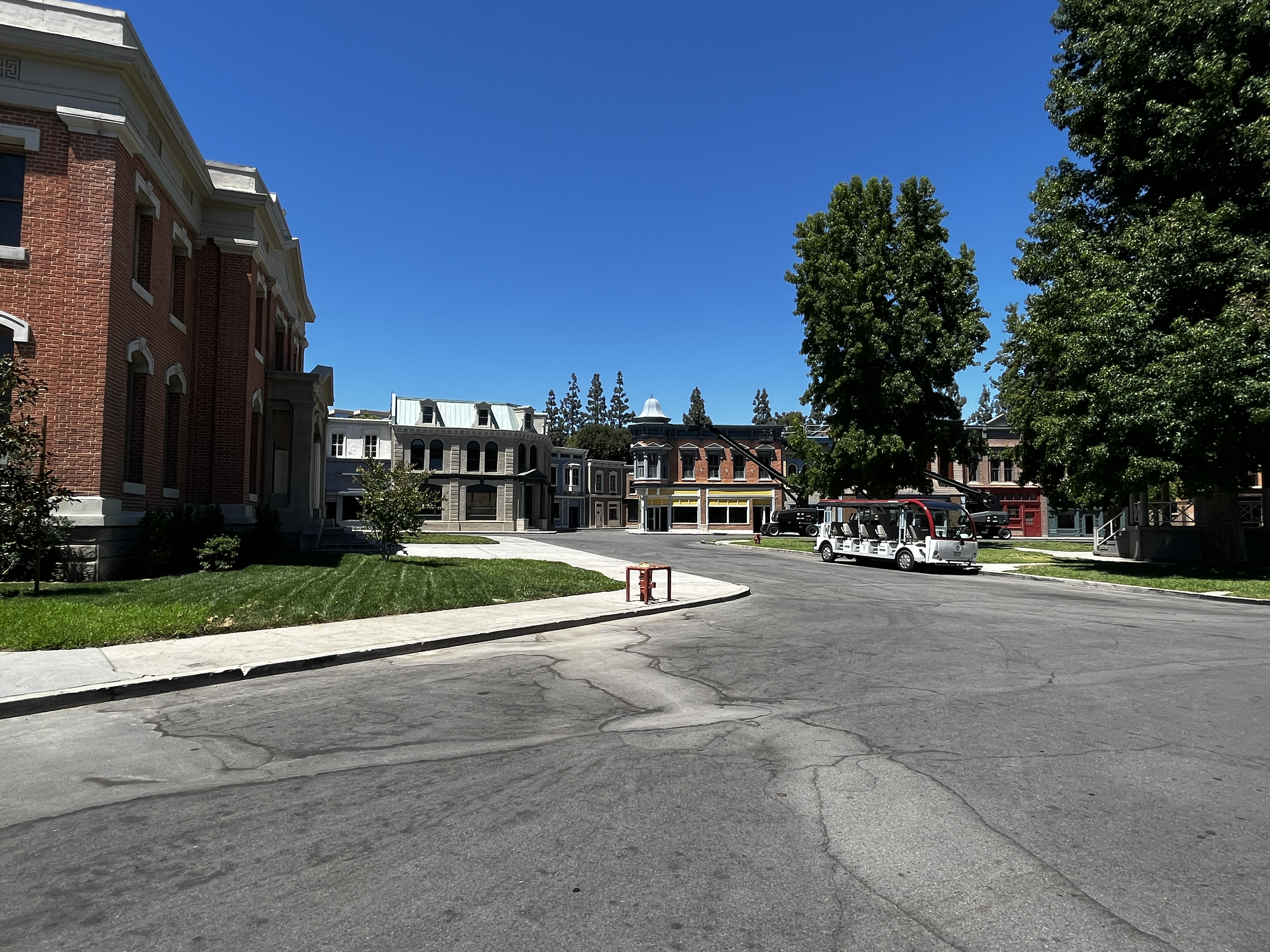
Disney's El Capitan Theatre (top) in Hollywood was used as the exterior for the Muppet Theater. The backlot sets at the Warner Bros. Studios (bottom) served as the fictional setting of Smalltown during the "Life's a Happy Song" sequence.

Principal photography for The Muppets began in September 2010, with the first set photos emerging in December 2010. The November 12, 2010, issue of Entertainment Weekly featured a spread about The Muppets, including a summary of the film's concept, quotes from Segel and Bobin, the first images of Walter, and new photos of the Muppets with Segel.

Hollywood Boulevard was closed for two nights in January 2011 to film a reprise of "Life's a Happy Song", the final musical number for the movie. According to /Film, the shoot involved Amy Adams, Jason Segel, and hundreds of extras performing an elaborate musical number outside the El Capitan Theatre. The Los Angeles Times also noted that other musical numbers would appear in the film, including Kermit singing his signature song, "Rainbow Connection", which he played on the same banjo that he used when he performed the song in The Muppet Movie (1979).

Universal Studios' Soundstage 28, most famous for containing the Paris Opera House set from The Phantom of the Opera, served as interiors for The Muppet Theater, whereas the El Capitan Theatre (with a digitally changed marquee) served as the exterior. Scenes set in Smalltown were filmed at the Warner Bros. Studios' backlot and Disney's Golden Oak Ranch, and the fictional "Muppet Studios" were filmed with exterior shots at the Jim Henson Company Lot (now Chaplin Studios) and interior shots at the Walt Disney Studios in Burbank.

Other filming locations included Greystone Mansion in Beverly Hills, Pink Palace Mansion in Bel Air, the fictional "Kermit's Office" was filmed at Crossroads of the World, Grauman's Chinese Theatre, and the City National Plaza in downtown Los Angeles (acting as the interior of Richman Oil's headquarters, although the Bank of America Center is represented on-screen in an establishing shot instead). Scooter's scene in the Muppet reunion montage was filmed at Google's Zürich headquarters in Switzerland. Although principal photography was completed on February 11, 2011, on April 26, 2011, a second unit film crew traveled to Reno, Nevada to film some exterior shots, including a scene in the Bonanza Casino parking lot with some Muppet characters, and a small shot looking into the casino.

The film required extensive blue-screen shots and matte backgrounds. In the scene where Walter is running atop a dresser, the puppeteers performed Walter's choreography while wearing blue costumes against a blue screen. The result had the puppeteers completely gone from the final shot. Look Effects were responsible for those visual effects shots, whereas Legacy Effects designed the mechanics for '80s Robot. A majority of the Muppet characters were also completely rebuilt for the film.

=== Music ===
The majority of the songs for The Muppets were written by Bret McKenzie, who previously worked with Bobin on a television series based on McKenzie's band Flight of the Conchords. One of the film's five songs, "Pictures in My Head", was produced by McKenzie and written by Jeannie Lurie, Aris Archontis, and Chen Neeman. At the Muppets performers' behest, McKenzie rewrote lyrics to remove moments where the characters directly referred to themselves as puppets. McKenzie was also informed during recording sessions with the performers that certain Muppets (such as chickens and penguins) do not speak and instead vocalize in onomatopoeic sounds. The film's score was composed by Christophe Beck. Beck described his role as having to "help tell the story musically, providing a sort of emotional glue―I had to pay special attention to blending the many styles of music so that it felt cohesive." Beck employed instruments he considered underused, as well as ones rarely used in an orchestral setting, such as the banjo.

The film's original soundtrack was released by Walt Disney Records on November 22, 2011, followed by a Spanish version of the soundtrack released as Los Muppets: Banda Sonora Original de Walt Disney Records on December 6, 2011.

== Release ==
The Muppets premiered at the 2011 Savannah Film Festival, and held its world premiere on November 12, 2011, at the El Capitan Theatre in Hollywood. The film was theatrically released in the United States on November 23, 2011, in Australia on January 12, 2012, and in the United Kingdom on February 10, 2012. Originally, it was scheduled to be released in the United States on Christmas 2011, but was later moved up to Thanksgiving. It was also the opening gala at the 2012 Glasgow Youth Film Festival. The film was accompanied by Pixar's Toy Story Toons short Small Fry. It was the first Walt Disney Pictures film to use a modified version of the studio's 2006 production logo, where the name was truncated to simply as "Disney".

Segel and Adams appeared at CinemaCon in March 2011, to promote the project, showcasing several clips from the film. Clips from the film were also shown at Suffolk University in April 2011 during a Q&A with David Hoberman, Steve Whitmire and Kermit the Frog. Although there had been some speculation that the cast would appear at Comic-Con, no official announcement was made.

=== Marketing ===
In May 2011, Kermit attended the world premiere of Pirates of the Caribbean: On Stranger Tides at Disneyland to promote the upcoming Muppets release. A spoof romantic comedy trailer for the movie was attached to Pirates of the Caribbean: On Stranger Tides, and it was later released online under the faux name Green with Envy. Additional spoof trailers parodied The Hangover Part II (called The Fuzzy Pack), Green Lantern (called Being Green), The Girl with the Dragon Tattoo (called The Pig with the Froggy Tattoo), Paranormal Activity 3 (called Abnormal Activity), Happy Feet Two (called Dancing on Happy Feet), Puss in Boots (called Fuss in Boots) and The Twilight Saga: Breaking Dawn – Part 1 (called Breaking Prawn). In November 2011, Brooks Brothers announced that it had designed a custom tuxedo wardrobe for Kermit the Frog for the film.

On August 23, 2011, Walt Disney Records released Muppets: The Green Album, a tribute album of popular Muppet songs performed by multiple contemporary artists, as part of the film's promotion, as well as reissuing the 2006 Christmas album on November 1, 2011. The Muppets also performed "Life's a Happy Song" on the November 15, 2011 episode of the American version of Dancing with the Stars.

Segel hosted Saturday Night Live on November 19, 2011, with the Muppets as guests. Kermit appeared on the Weekend Update segment, doing a "Really!?!" segment.

The Muppets were guest stars on WWE Monday Night RAW and interacted with several WWE Superstars including Jack Swagger, Hornswoggle, and Sheamus. They also joined Olly Murs on stage during the UK version of The X Factor on November 27, 2011, to perform his new single "Dance With Me Tonight" and promote their new film.

An iPhone app called Tap Tap Muppets was released for the iPhone the day prior to the film's release. The app features six new musical numbers and three classic Muppet songs: "The Muppet Show Theme", "Rainbow Connection", and "Mah Nà Mah Nà".

=== Home media ===
Walt Disney Studios Home Entertainment released The Muppets on Blu-ray Disc, DVD, and digital download on March 20, 2012, the same day the Muppets received a collective star on the Hollywood Walk of Fame. The release was produced in four different physical packages: a three-disc combo pack (Blu-ray, DVD, and digital copy) with soundtrack download ("The Wocka Wocka Value Pack"); a two-disc combo pack (Blu-ray and DVD); a one-disc DVD with soundtrack download; and a one-disc DVD without soundtrack download. The film was released digitally in high definition and standard definition. The two-disc edition's supplementary features include bloopers, deleted and alternate scenes, "Muppet Intermission", "Scratching the Surface: A Hasty Examination of the Making of Disney's The Muppets", the fully intact version of "Let's Talk About Me", "A Little Screen Test on the Way to the Read Through," and an audio commentary with Jason Segel, James Bobin, and Nicholas Stoller. The three-disc combo pack also includes the theatrical spoof trailers (including exclusive, unreleased parody trailers of Rise of the Planet of the Apes and Fast Five) and a digital download of the soundtrack, while still including the same features as the two-disc combo pack.

The Muppets debuted at No. 2 in Blu-ray and DVD sales in the United States according to Nielsen's sales chart. The film generated an additional $58.3 million in home media sales.

=== Streaming ===
The Muppets became available to stream on Disney+ upon the launch of the service in November 2019. In September 2020, the film was added to Netflix in the United States and was removed in September 2021.

== Reception ==
=== Box office ===
The Muppets was a commercial success, accumulating a box office gross nearly quadruple its $45 million budget. It grossed $6.5 million on its opening day and debuted in second place, behind The Twilight Saga: Breaking Dawn – Part 1. The following day, Thanksgiving Day, the film grossed $5.8 million for a two-day total of $12.5 million. From Friday to Sunday, The Muppets grossed $29.2 million, while holding onto the No. 2 spot. Overall, the film grossed $41.5 million in five days; during which, it outgrossed every previous Muppet film, excluding The Muppet Movie. The film closed on April 5, 2012, having grossed $88,631,237 in North America, along with $83,171,761 in other territories, for a worldwide total of $171,802,998, becoming the highest-grossing puppet film of all time.

=== Critical response ===
On Rotten Tomatoes, the film has a rating of 95% based on 228 reviews, with an average rating of 7.9/10. The site's critical consensus reads: "Clever, charming, and heartfelt, The Muppets is a welcome big screen return for Jim Henson's lovable creations that will both win new fans and delight longtime devotees." On Metacritic, the film has a score of 75 out of 100, based on 37 critics, indicating "generally favorable reviews". Audiences surveyed by CinemaScore gave The Muppets an "A" grade rating on an A+ to F scale.

Film critic Roger Ebert gave the film three stars out of four, praising the revitalized Muppets and their distinctive personalities. Justin Chang of Variety called it "an unexpected treat", noting that the film effortlessly blends "wised-up, self-reflective humor with old-fashioned let's-put-on-a-show pizzazz." Todd McCarthy of The Hollywood Reporter praised the film as "A mostly winning return for childhood favorites from a prior century [that] looks to accomplish its goal of pleasing old fans and winning new ones." Alonso Duralde of The Wrap agreed writing that, "The Muppets has the same brilliant absurdity, anarchic humor, subtle uplift and ensemble comedy that fans have come to expect over the years." Both the Los Angeles Times and Entertainment Weekly praised the screenplay's self-referential humor, Segel and Adams' supporting roles, and the film's clever employment of cameos.

Michael Phillips gave the film three out of four stars, positively summarizing that "those of us who've had Muppets in our memory since childhood will find ourselves in a state of contentment." Peter Travers, writing for Rolling Stone, commended the film's musical segments, particularly Bret McKenzie's "Man or Muppet". The Boston Globe also gave it three out of four stars and said, "The result is refreshing on every level, a piece of nostalgia so old it's new again, and a breather from Hollywood's 3-D digital onslaught in favor of fur and fuzz." Christopher Kelly of the Fort Worth Star-Telegram stated that the film was "much more than just an affectionate reimagining of familiar Muppets routines, [but it] is rooted in real emotions and characters," and that "they remain as committed as ever to doing what Muppets do best: putting on a grand show."

=== Response from Frank Oz ===
Prior to the film's release, some veteran Muppet performers were reportedly critical about the film's portrayal of the characters. Retired Muppet performer Frank Oz initially disapproved of the script and thought that the early version was disrespectful toward the characters.

After the film's release, Oz clarified his earlier statements:

I thought the film was really sweet and fun, a little too safe, a little retro. I prefer more cutting edge in the Muppets. But the main thing is everybody got back to appreciating The Muppets...it brought people back to The Muppets. Although they never really left, it's always been a kind of subculture, it's always been there in our popular culture a little bit. So I'm happy that people are happy.

=== Accolades ===
Bret McKenzie won an Academy Award for the song "Man or Muppet", beating out "Real in Rio" from Rio. "Life's a Happy Song" and "Pictures in my Head" were also included in the Academy's shortlist for Best Original Song. Although it was the fourth Muppet film to receive an Oscar nomination, this was the first time a Muppet film had won an Academy Award. It was the first Muppet film nominated for Best Original Song since 1981's The Great Muppet Caper and the first time a Muppet film in general had been nominated for any kind of Academy Award since 1984's The Muppets Take Manhattan.

List of awards and nominations
Award	Date of ceremony	Category	Recipients	Result
Academy Awards	February 26, 2012	Best Original Song	"Man or Muppet" – Bret McKenzie	Won
British Academy Film Awards	February 12, 2013	Outstanding Debut by a British Writer, Director or Producer	James Bobin	Nominated
Critics' Choice Movie Award	January 12, 2012	Best Comedy Film	The Muppets	Nominated
Critics' Choice Movie Award	January 12, 2012	Best Song	"Life's a Happy Song" – Bret McKenzie	Won
Critics' Choice Movie Award	January 12, 2012	Best Song	"Man or Muppet" – Bret McKenzie	Nominated
Critics' Choice Movie Award	January 12, 2012	Best Song	"Pictures in My Head" – Jeannie Lurie, Aris Archontis and Chen Neeman	Nominated
Dorian Awards	January 19, 2012	Campy (Intentional or Not) Film of the Year	The Muppets	Won
Golden Reel Awards	February 19, 2012	Best Sound Editing: Music in a Musical Feature Film	Lisa Jaime and Richard Ford	Won
Grammy Awards	February 10, 2013	Best Compilation Soundtrack for Visual Media	Original soundtrack	Nominated
Grammy Awards	February 10, 2013	Best Song Written for Visual Media	"Man or Muppet" – Bret McKenzie	Nominated
Houston Film Critics Society	December 13, 2011	Best Song	"Life's a Happy Song" – Bret McKenzie	Won
Kerrang! Awards	June 7, 2012	Best Film	The Muppets	Nominated
Kid's Choice Awards	March 31, 2012	Favorite Movie	The Muppets	Nominated
Kid's Choice Awards	March 31, 2012	Favorite Movie Actress	Amy Adams	Nominated
Satellite Awards	December 18, 2011	Motion Picture, Animated or Mixed Media	Walt Disney Pictures	Nominated
Satellite Awards	December 18, 2011	Original Song	"Man or Muppet" – Bret McKenzie	Nominated
Satellite Awards	December 18, 2011	Original Song	"Life's a Happy Song" – Bret McKenzie	Nominated
Saturn Awards	July 26, 2012	Best Fantasy Film	The Muppets	Nominated
St. Louis Film Critics Association	December 12, 2011	Best Adapted Screenplay	Jason Segel and Nicholas Stoller	Nominated
St. Louis Film Critics Association	December 12, 2011	Best Comedy	The Muppets	Nominated
St. Louis Film Critics Association	December 12, 2011	Best Music		Nominated
Teen Choice Awards	July 22, 2012	Choice Movie Comedy	The Muppets	Nominated
Women Film Critics Circle Awards	December 22, 2011	Best Family Film	The Muppets	Nominated

== Sequel ==
In March 2012, after the critical and commercial success of the film, Disney secured a deal with Bobin and Stoller to direct and write, respectively, a new installment. Later that month, Segel stated that he would have no involvement in the sequel. On April 24, Disney officially announced that the sequel was in development and that Ricky Gervais, Ty Burrell, and Tina Fey were cast in the film, with Hoberman and Lieberman returning as producers, as well as McKenzie returning to write the film's songs. Muppets Most Wanted was released on March 21, 2014.
