= Hatbox Ghost =

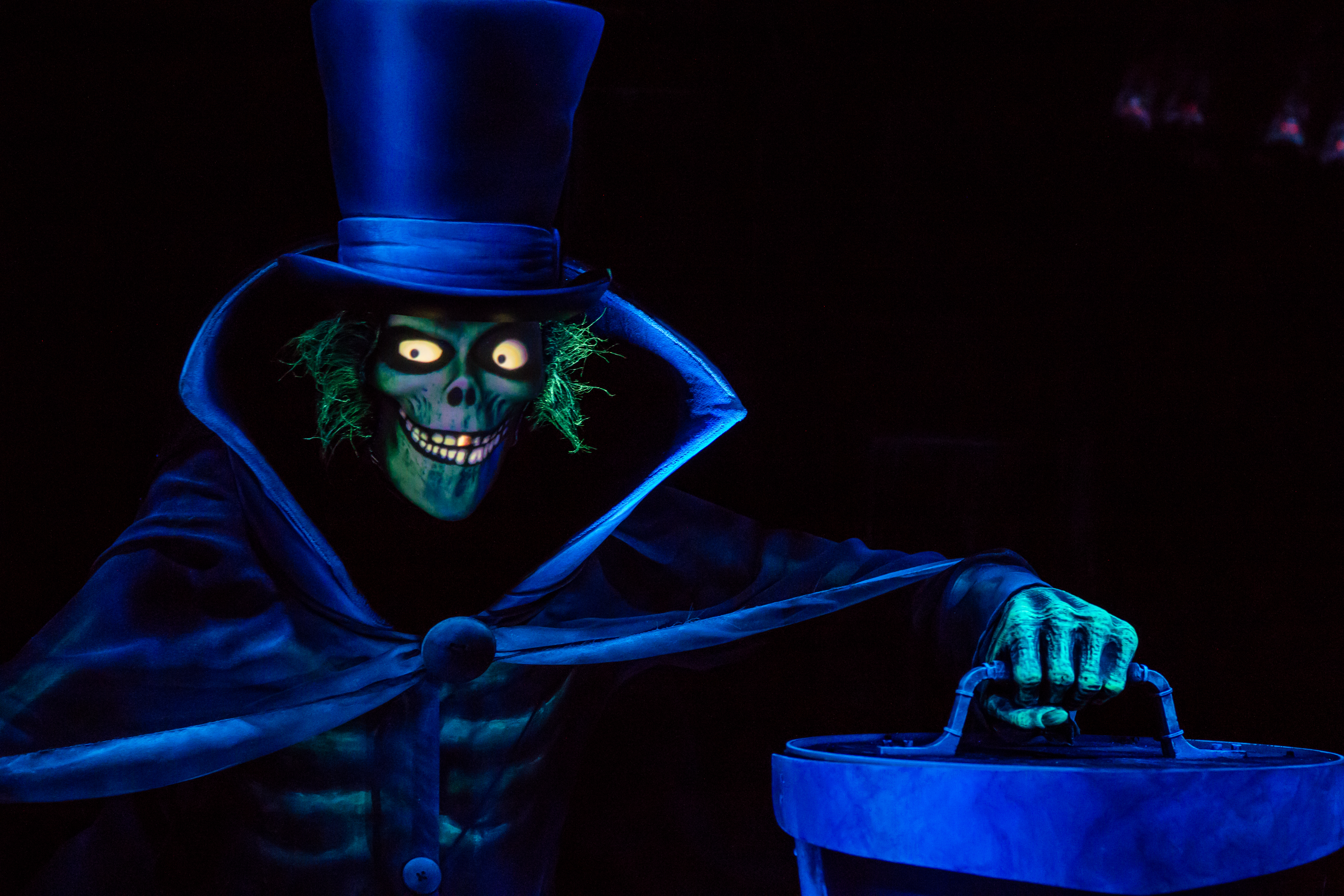
- The 2015 installation of the Hatbox Ghost
- First appearance: The Haunted Mansion
- Portrayed by: Corey Burton (2010); Eric Jacobson (2021); Jared Leto (2023)

In-universe information
- Aliases: Randall Pace (SLG comics); Hattie/Hatty (fan name); Alistair Crump (2023 film)

The Hatbox Ghost is an animatronic character created for the Disneyland attraction The Haunted Mansion. The character is depicted as a ghost of a top hat and cloak-wearing elderly man whose head disappears from his body and disembodily reappears inside a hat box he carries.

The original animatronic appeared in The Haunted Mansion when it opened in 1969, but was quickly removed due to the effect not working properly. The Hatbox Ghost remained absent from the attraction until 2015 when a new animatronic was added following Disneyland's 60th anniversary celebration.

== History ==
=== Idea ===
The idea behind the Hatbox Ghost figure was for its head to vanish from atop its shoulders and reappear alternately inside the hatbox, in time with an adjacent bride figure's beating heart.

=== Implementation and decommissioning ===
The Hatbox Ghost figure was installed inside The Haunted Mansion and in place for cast member (park employee) previews on the nights of August 7 and 8, 1969. Almost immediately, it became apparent that the effect had failed, as ambient light in the attraction's attic scene prevented the ghost's face from disappearing fully, despite its designated spotlight going dark. Attempts were made to remedy technical problems, but the effect was not convincing enough, and the ghost was decommissioned. And on the DVD, "Disneyland Resort: Imagineering the Magic," Senior Vice President of Creative Development at Walt Disney Imagineering Tony Baxter displays an attraction maintenance slip that lists the original Hatbox Ghost.

While a definite record of what became of the Hatbox Ghost figure has not been published, there are speculations as to its fate.

=== Return ===
After the end of the 2014 Haunted Mansion Holiday overlay, and when the Mansion was returned to its original state, guests observed what appeared to be a temporary work wall at the end of the attic scene. This created much speculation that the Hatbox Ghost would return as part of the park's 60th anniversary.

On April 10, 2015, it was officially confirmed that the Hatbox Ghost figure would return to Disneyland's Haunted Mansion in May 2015. It was later announced that the first day of the character's return would be May 9, 2015.

The 2015 installation of the Hatbox Ghost figure is a new animatronic, designed to resemble the original. The new version's face is an animation that is projected onto the figure, similarly to the "Constance the Bride" figure. The character looks back and forth and narrows his eyes before his head dissolves into mist and vanishes. As the head vanishes, a chuckle can be heard. The head then appears inside the hatbox before vanishing into the shadows again, but without an accompanying chuckle or any mist.

On September 11, 2022, the official Disney Parks team announced the Hatbox Ghost would make its debut at Walt Disney World's Haunted Mansion in 2023. In July 2023, Disney announced that the new Hatbox Ghost would be placed near the Endless Hallway scene in the Walt Disney World version of the Haunted Mansion, rather than mimicking its Disneyland iteration in the Attic scene. This decision caused controversy, with some fans arguing that a ghost character is not supposed to be seen until Madame Leota's introduction. On November 30, 2023, the Hatbox Ghost was confirmed to have been added to the attraction by park attendees, which is part of The Walt Disney Company's centennial celebration.

== In popular culture and other media ==
In the 2003 House of Mouse episode "House Ghosts", he appears to scare Pete along with the Hitchhiking Ghosts, the Lonesome Ghosts, the Executioner, the eponymous skeletons of The Skeleton Dance and the Bride.

In 2009, the Hatbox Ghost appeared repeatedly in art and souvenirs created for the 40th anniversary of The Haunted Mansion, in response to fan interest in the character. Artists Kevin Kidney and Jody Daily crafted their version of a life-sized replica of The Hatbox Ghost that was auctioned for $9,400 at the first D23 Expo, held in September of the same year. In addition, The Hatbox Ghost was the official "spooksperson" for Disneyland Resort's 2009 O-pin House pin trading event and Haunted Holidays celebration.

In July 2010, director Guillermo del Toro, participating in a panel discussion at Comic-Con, announced his involvement as co-writer and producer in a new film based on The Haunted Mansion attraction. He stated that in his version of the ride's story, The Hatbox Ghost will be a pivotal character. While this version of the film never materialized, The Hatbox Ghost would eventually become the main antagonist of Justin Simien's 2023 film adaptation where he is portrayed by Jared Leto through motion capture. Here, the ghost is the malicious spirit of Alistair Crump, a murderous tycoon obsessed with the occult who was assassinated by his much-abused staff, but not before he vowed revenge. After he began gathering power in the netherworld, Crump took over Gracey Manor after being unwittingly summoned there by William Gracey and Madame Leota. Now, he seeks to collect one thousand souls to gain ultimate power and escape from the mansion in order to make his plot for revenge against the living world a reality.

In August at the 2013 D23 Expo, a new Hatbox Ghost animatronic was displayed at the "Journey Into Imagineering" exhibit. Contrary to the original figure's hunched over appearance, this figure stood straight and tall, and did not hold a hatbox. There had been no word from Disney on whether the figure was built solely for the D23 exhibit, or whether the figure would make an appearance in the attraction at some point.

The Hatbox Ghost appear as a playable character in the video games Disney Crossy Road and Disney Magic Kingdoms.

The Hatbox Ghost is featured in two comic book adaptations of the Haunted Mansion. In the 2005 Slave Labor Graphics Haunted Mansion anthology series, the Hatbox Ghost plays a role in the "Mystery of the Manse" origin story serial, being the ghost of Randall Pace, a ship captain and gunrunner that was beheaded after his first mate William Gracey mutinied against him. When Madame Leota summons spirits to ruin Gracey's wedding years later, he frightens the bride to death when reclaiming his head and telling her the truth of Gracey's pirate past. In the 2016 Disney Kingdoms miniseries adaptation of the Haunted Mansion, the Hatbox Ghost is one of four legendary ghosts that died within the Mansion that control some of its supernatural powers. Leaning on his long absence from the attraction, the Hatbox Ghost is depicted as a wise world traveler that has journeyed to different haunted locations connected to the Mansion by way of the M.C. Escher-like Endless Staircase seen in the Florida attraction.

In the 2021 Muppets Haunted Mansion Halloween special, Fozzie Bear plays the role of Gauzey the Hatbox Bear, who uses his trick in his comedy act.
