= Haunted Mansion (2023 film) =

2023 film by Justin Simien

- Theatrical release poster
- Directed by: Justin Simien
- Screenplay by: Katie Dippold
- Based on: The Haunted Mansion by Walt Disney
- Produced by: Dan Lin; Jonathan Eirich
- Starring: LaKeith Stanfield; Tiffany Haddish; Owen Wilson; Danny DeVito; Rosario Dawson; Dan Levy; Jamie Lee Curtis; Jared Leto
- Cinematography: Jeffrey Waldron
- Edited by: Phillip J. Bartell
- Music by: Kris Bowers
- Production companies: Walt Disney Pictures; Rideback
- Distributed by: Walt Disney Studios Motion Pictures
- Release dates: July 15, 2023 (Disneyland); July 28, 2023 (United States)
- Running time: 123 minutes
- Country: United States
- Language: English
- Budget: $150 million
- Box office: $117.5 million

Haunted Mansion is a 2023 American supernatural horror comedy film directed by Justin Simien from a screenplay by Katie Dippold. Produced by Walt Disney Pictures and Rideback, it stars LaKeith Stanfield, Tiffany Haddish, Owen Wilson, Danny DeVito, Rosario Dawson, Dan Levy, Jamie Lee Curtis and Jared Leto. It is the second film adaptation of Disneyland's eponymous attraction, following the initial one from 2003. In the film, a widow and her son (Dawson and Chase W. Dillon, respectively) enlist the aid of an astrophysicist-turned-tour guide (Stanfield), a struggling psychic (Haddish), a con man posing as a trained priest (Wilson) and a college historian (DeVito) to help exorcise the ghostly inhabitants of the titular building that they have recently moved into.

Plans for the reboot adaptation based on the Haunted Mansion began in July 2010, when Guillermo del Toro, who intended to write and produce, stated the project would take place in a heightened reality rather than in a real-world setting. Del Toro was no longer attached as the project's director in July 2013. After years in development hell, Disney officially announced Haunted Mansion in August 2020, with Dippold signed on to write a new screenplay. Simien negotiated to direct the film by April 2021, and was officially confirmed three months later. The primary cast was confirmed from July to October, and additional cast was announced the following year. Principal photography took place from mid-October 2021 to late-February 2022 on a $150 million budget.

Haunted Mansion premiered at Disneyland in Anaheim, California, on July 15, 2023, and was released in the United States on July 28 by Walt Disney Studios Motion Pictures. The film received mixed reviews from critics and grossed $118 million worldwide, becoming a box-office bomb and losing Disney an estimated $117 million. Journalists criticized the film for its repeated use of product placement.

== Plot ==
In New Orleans, Ben Matthias, an astrophysicist developing a camera to detect dark matter, marries Alyssa, a tour guide for the city's famously haunted places. Following Alyssa's death in a car crash, a despondent Ben gives up his career and continues to run her tour, despite his disbelief in the supernatural. Meanwhile, widowed doctor Gabbie and her son Travis move into the abandoned Gracey Manor, planning to turn the mansion into a bed and breakfast, only to discover that it is infested with ghosts.

Father Kent, an exorcist helping Gabbie, hires Ben to photograph Gracey Manor's ghosts. Unable to find any evidence, he returns home and is haunted by a ghost of a mariner, forcing him to return to the mansion as he learns that the others have fallen victim to hauntings as well. They recruit psychic Harriet and steal the mansion's blueprints from historian Professor Bruce Davis. The group finds a hidden séance room where Harriet contacts the spirit of William Gracey, who writes a message instructing them to talk to legendary medium Madame Leota. A malevolent entity forces Harriet out of the house, while Bruce arrives and is forced out as well.

The group stays at the mansion, searching for Leota. In the attic, Ben runs afoul of ghostly bride Constance Hatchaway and finds a locked trunk containing a crystal ball holding Leota herself. She discloses that Gracey recruited her to contact the spirit of his late wife every night for an entire year, resulting in the mansion's ghosts taking up residence. A malevolent spirit later tricked Gracey into committing suicide and trapped Leota inside her crystal ball; having acquired 999 souls throughout the years, the spirit needs one more in order to escape from the mansion. When Harriet performs an astral projection, Ben is sent out of his body instead and encounters Gracey's ghost and the malevolent spirit, whose head disappears and reappears within a hat box they carry.

A police sketch artist draws the ghost, allowing the group to identify him as Alistair Crump, a wealthy heir who was shunned by his father and high society; after his father's mysterious death, a vengeful Crump lured his fellow socialites to their deaths while developing an obsession with the occult, until he was assassinated by his much-abused staff. Crump seals the mansion but Ben, Kent and Travis escape to his family home, where the mariner leads them to Crump's hat to use in a banishment ritual.

Returning to Gracey Manor, Kent confesses that he is actually a con man, but he and Ben soon rescue their friends. Crump incinerates his hat and, having been impersonating Travis' late father, plots to make him his final soul. Ben convinces Travis not to give in to his grief and they and Gabbie confront Crump in the mansion's graveyard. Kent rallies the ghosts to rebel against Crump, while Harriet frees Leota and Bruce recovers the remnants of the hat to carry out the banishment ritual. Crump tempts Ben to become his final soul and be reunited with Alyssa, but Ben makes his peace with losing her as Crump is sent back to the netherworld upon the ritual's completion.

Ben continues to move on with his life and on Halloween, discovers the cat staying by his door is named Tater Tot, a nod to his wife's love for the food. The group reunites at the mansion for a Halloween party; Ben has returned to teaching, Harriet has regained confidence in her psychic abilities, Kent has been ordained, Travis is elected class vice president, Gabbie has been hired at the local hospital, Bruce maintains his newfound friendships and many of the ghosts have chosen to stay at the mansion, now in harmony with the living residents.

== Cast ==
- LaKeith Stanfield as Ben Matthias, a cynical astrophysicist-turned-tour guide
- Tiffany Haddish as Harriet, a psychic with genuine abilities
- Owen Wilson as Father Kent, a conman posing as a priest and trained exorcist
- Danny DeVito as Bruce Davis, a college historian and professor at Tulane University
- Rosario Dawson as Gabbie, a widowed doctor from New York
- Chase W. Dillon as Travis, Gabbie's son who is elected class vice president
- Jamie Lee Curtis as Madame Leota, the psychic responsible for summoning the mansion's many ghostly occupants
- Jared Leto as the motion capture performance of Alistair Crump alias The Hatbox Ghost. The character's surname is a tribute to Imagineer Rolly Crump, one of the lead designers of the source material who died four months prior to the film's premiere. Leto's likeness was used for Crump's appearance in an enhanced facial composite and the animation depicting his origins.
- Daniel Levy as Vic, an entertainment tour guide
- Hasan Minhaj as a police sketch artist
- Marilu Henner as Carol, a tourist in New Orleans
- Jo Koy as a bartender
- J. R. Adduci as William Gracey, the first owner of the mansion
- Steve Zissis as Roger
- Winona Ryder as Pat, a New Orleans tour guide (uncredited)

== Production ==
=== Development ===
In July 2010, it was announced that a reboot adaptation based on The Haunted Mansion was in development for Walt Disney Pictures, with Guillermo del Toro as writer and producer. Del Toro stated the project would not take place in a real-world setting, but in a heightened reality. He revealed that the Hatbox Ghost would be one of the main characters and said the film would be "scary and fun at the same time, but the scary will be scary". In June 2011, Walt Disney World Imagineer Jason Surrell was brought onto the project as a creative consultant. In August 2012, Del Toro submitted the final draft of his script to Walt Disney Studios, intended for a PG-13 rating. By July 2013, Del Toro announced he was no longer the project's director, but remained as co-writer and executive producer. In April 2015, Ryan Gosling was in early negotiations to star, while D.V. DeVincentis was hired to rewrite the script. In September 2016, Brigham Taylor was hired as producer.

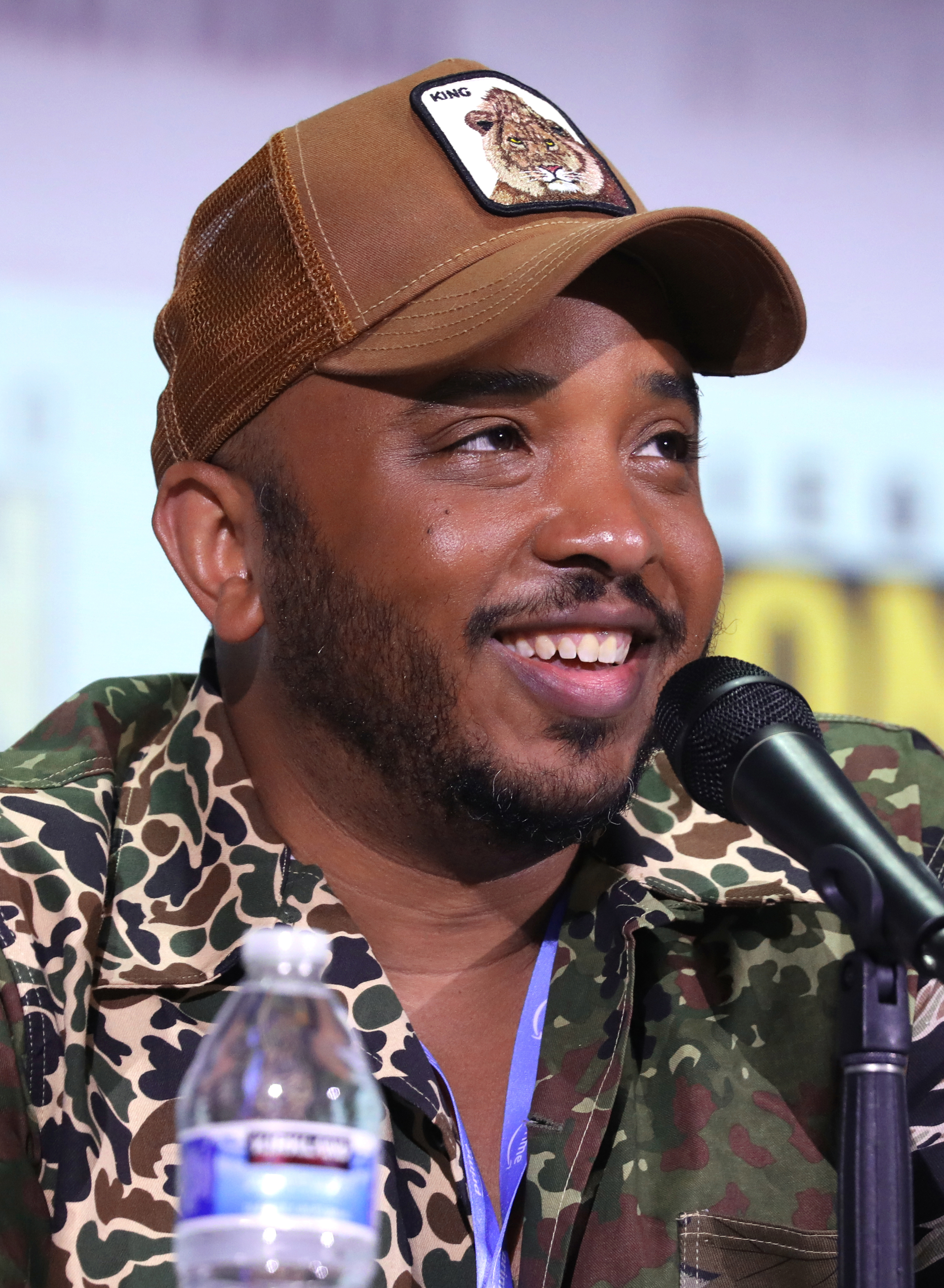
Director Justin Simien at the 2023 San Diego Comic-Con

In August 2020, it was announced that Katie Dippold signed on to write a new screenplay for the film, after it was decided that Del Toro's script was too scary for family audiences. Dan Lin and Jonathan Eirich were hired as producers. The project would be a joint-venture production between Walt Disney Pictures and Rideback. By April 2021, Justin Simien entered early-negotiations to direct the film, and was officially confirmed as director by July 2021.

Bryan Cogman, Del Toro, DeVincentis, Micah Fitzerman-Blue, Noah Harpster, Justin Haythe, Jeff Nathanson, Matthew Robbins, Simien, Steven Thompson, and Chris Weitz wrote additional literary material for the film.

In a behind-the-features featurette, production designer Darren Gilford revealed that the crew had an after-hours tour on the actual Haunted Mansion ride at Walt Disney World. The crew then pulled details from the ride to use for the sets.

=== Casting ===
Tiffany Haddish, LaKeith Stanfield, Owen Wilson, Rosario Dawson, and Danny DeVito were each cast to appear in the film. In July 2022, Jamie Lee Curtis and Jared Leto were revealed to have been cast. During the 2022 D23 Expo presentation, it was revealed that Winona Ryder, Dan Levy, and Hasan Minhaj were cast.

=== Filming and post-production ===
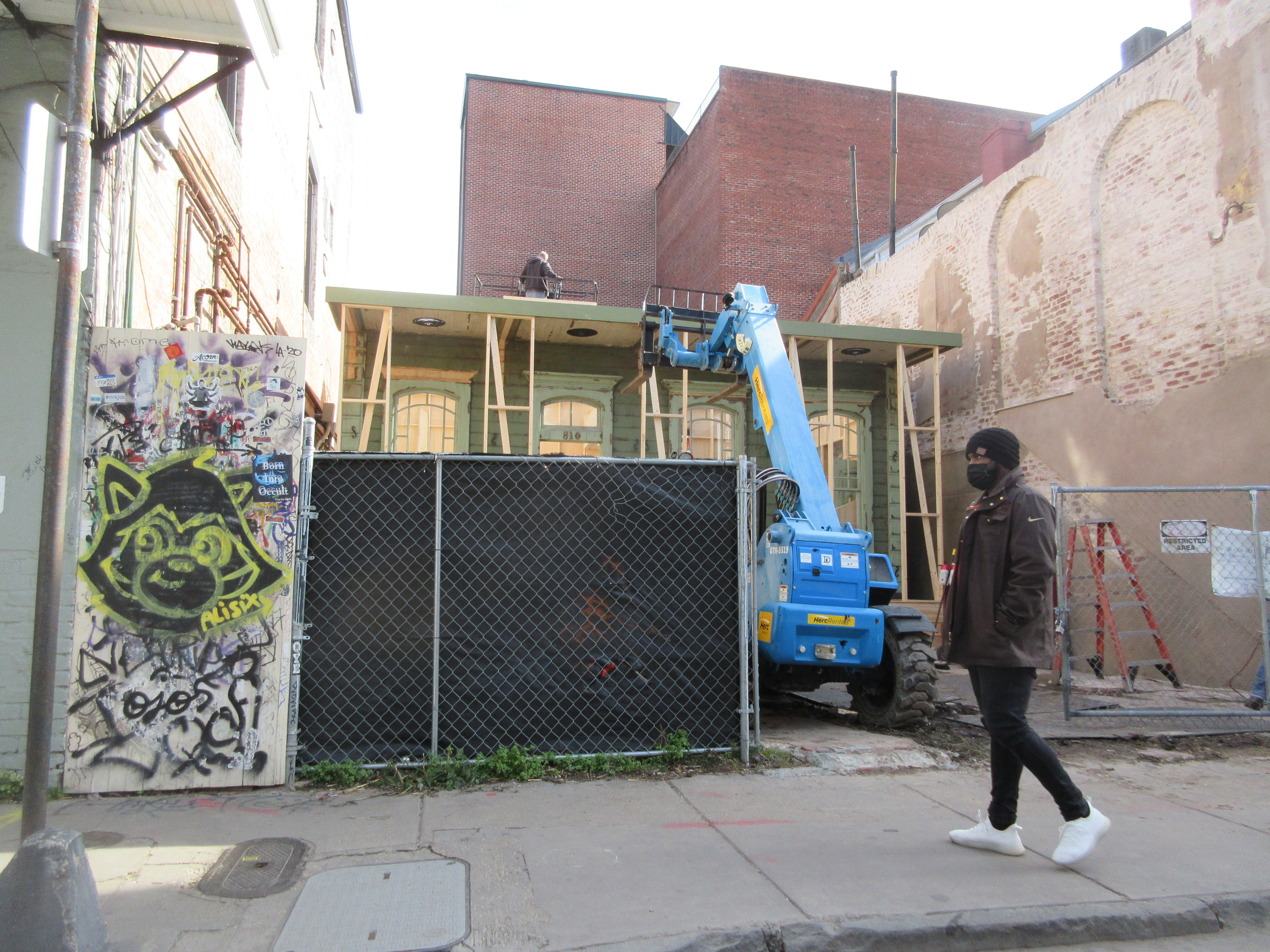
Construction of a film set on Royal Street in the French Quarter of New Orleans, January 2022

Principal photography ran from October 4, 2021, to late February 2022 in New Orleans, Louisiana, and Atlanta, Georgia. Production also occurred at Trilith Studios. The visual effects were handled by DNEG and Industrial Light & Magic.

=== Music ===
Kris Bowers composed the film's score. The soundtrack album was released on July 26 by Walt Disney Records, two days before the film.

== Release ==
=== Theatrical release ===
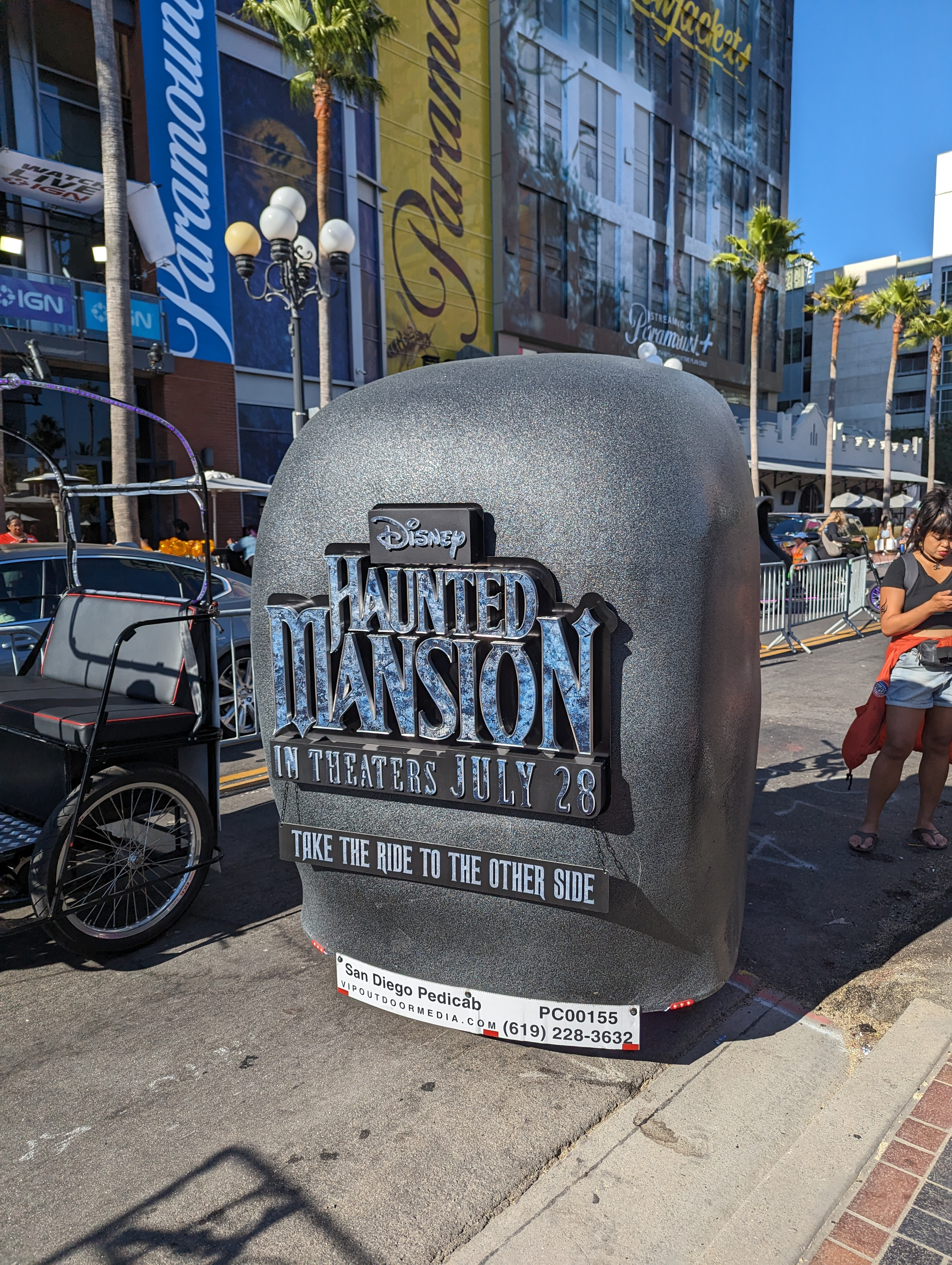
Pedicab promoting Haunted Mansion in San Diego, California

Haunted Mansion had its world premiere at Disneyland in Anaheim, California, on July 15, 2023. Due to the 2023 SAG-AFTRA strike occurring a few days prior, the film's cast members could not attend the premiere, with the park's Disney characters including Mickey Mouse, Minnie Mouse, and Disney villains such as Maleficent, Cruella de Vil, and the Evil Queen walking the red carpet instead. It was released theatrically in the United States on July 28 in 4DX and Dolby Cinema formats. It was previously scheduled for March 10, 2023, and then August 11, 2023.

=== Marketing ===
Before the film's release, the cast appeared on the game show Celebrity Family Feud.

=== Home media ===
Haunted Mansion was released on digital platforms on October 3, Disney+ on October 4, and Blu-ray and DVD on October 17.

In the United States, Haunted Mansion ranked No. 7 Vudu's weekly digital sales and rental chart for the week ending October 8, following its premium digital release on October 4. The following week, the film placed No. 9. The film returned to Vudu's weekly digital sales and rental chart for the week ending October 29, ranking No. 9. On physical media, Haunted Mansion was the fourth best-selling film for the week ending October 28, according to Circana's VideoScan tracking service, which compiles DVD and Blu-ray sale.

Nielsen Media Research, which records streaming viewership on certain American television screens, reported that Haunted Mansion garnered 992 million minutes of watch time from October 2–8, ranking as the most-streamed film. During the following week, from October 9–15, the film accumulated 656 million minutes viewed, again ranking No. 1. Between October 16–22, Haunted Mansion recorded 413 million minutes of watch time, ranking as the fourth most-streamed film. Haunted Mansion was the most-watched horror film through October 2023 when considering linear and streaming movie viewing, generating 2.446 billion minutes of viewing, according to Nielsen. The film was subsequently streamed for 440 million minutes in October 2024, ranking as the fifth most-watched horror film during that period.

== Reception ==
=== Box office ===
In the United States and Canada, the film was released alongside Talk to Me, and was projected to gross $25–30 million from 3,740 theaters in its opening weekend, though a debut of $20–25 million had also been considered possible. It made $10 million on its first day, including $3.1 million from Thursday night previews. It went on to debut to $24.1 million, finishing in third below Barbie and Oppenheimer, and failing to top the opening weekend of the 2003 film ($24.3 million, unadjusted for inflation). Reasons for the low opening have been cited for competition from Barbie and Oppenheimer, lack of marketing, divided word of mouth, and its Halloween-esque tone. Disney suggested that not having the cast available for promotional appearances (due to the 2023 SAG-AFTRA strike) had a negative impact on the opening weekend. Given its $150 million production budget, Variety opined the opening was "not a great result for a kid-centric tentpole", and that the film was "Halloween-esque". The film fell 62% in its second weekend to $9.2 million, finishing fifth.

Haunted Mansion grossed $67.7 million in the United States and Canada, and $49.8 million in other territories, for worldwide gross of $117.5 million. Deadline Hollywood calculated the net losses of the film to be $117 million, when factoring together all expenses and revenues.

=== Critical response ===
On the review aggregator website Rotten Tomatoes, 38% of 255 critics' reviews are positive, with an average rating of 5.1/10. The website's consensus reads: "Haunted Mansion's talented cast makes the movie a pleasant enough destination, although it's neither scary nor funny enough to wholeheartedly recommend." Metacritic, which uses a weighted average, assigned the film a score of 47 out of 100, based on 52 critics, indicating "mixed or average" reviews. Audiences surveyed by CinemaScore gave the film an average grade of "B+" on an A+ to F scale, while those polled at PostTrak gave it an 80% overall positive score, with 60% saying they would definitely recommend the film.

Peter Bradshaw from The Guardian gave the film two out of five stars, and stated, "Lakeith Stanfield, Rosario Dawson, Owen Wilson and Jamie Lee Curtis cannot save this laborious story of a creepy old dwelling and the awful Hatbox Ghost." In a two out of five review, Kim Newman of Empire said, "Resembling a kids'-birthday-party remake of 1973's The Legend of Hell House, this suffers from being not that funny or spooky. Its saving grace is a cast you’re happy to spend time with." Peter Debruge of Variety wrote, "While the visual effects are surprisingly weak for a film of this scale, the script proves far better than anyone might expect, establishing an emotional foundation for what might otherwise be a gimmick-driven haunted house movie." Lucas Trevor of The Washington Post wrote, "It's too dark for a family film, too weightless and juvenile for grown-ups. In a season notable for high-level action spectacle and important auteur projects, Haunted Mansion is not just confused but inconsequential."

==== Criticism of product placement ====
The extensive use of product placement in the film generated online controversy. Aleena Malik wrote for Screen Rant that "movies tend to find organic ways to integrate product placement into the story and limit how many they include, but Haunted Mansion did the opposite. The call-outs to different products and brands felt excessive and completely out of place". In his negative review of the film for Rolling Stone, David Fear cited "the blatant product placement for Burger King jalapeño poppers" as one of its chief flaws. Users on Letterboxd and Twitter were critical of the placements.

=== Accolades ===
Haunted Mansion was nominated for Best Fantasy Film at the 51st Saturn Awards. It received a nomination for Best Contemporary Makeup - Feature-Length Motion Picture at the 16th Make-Up Artists & Hair Stylists Guild Awards.
