= Mystic Manor =

Hong Kong Disneyland dark ride

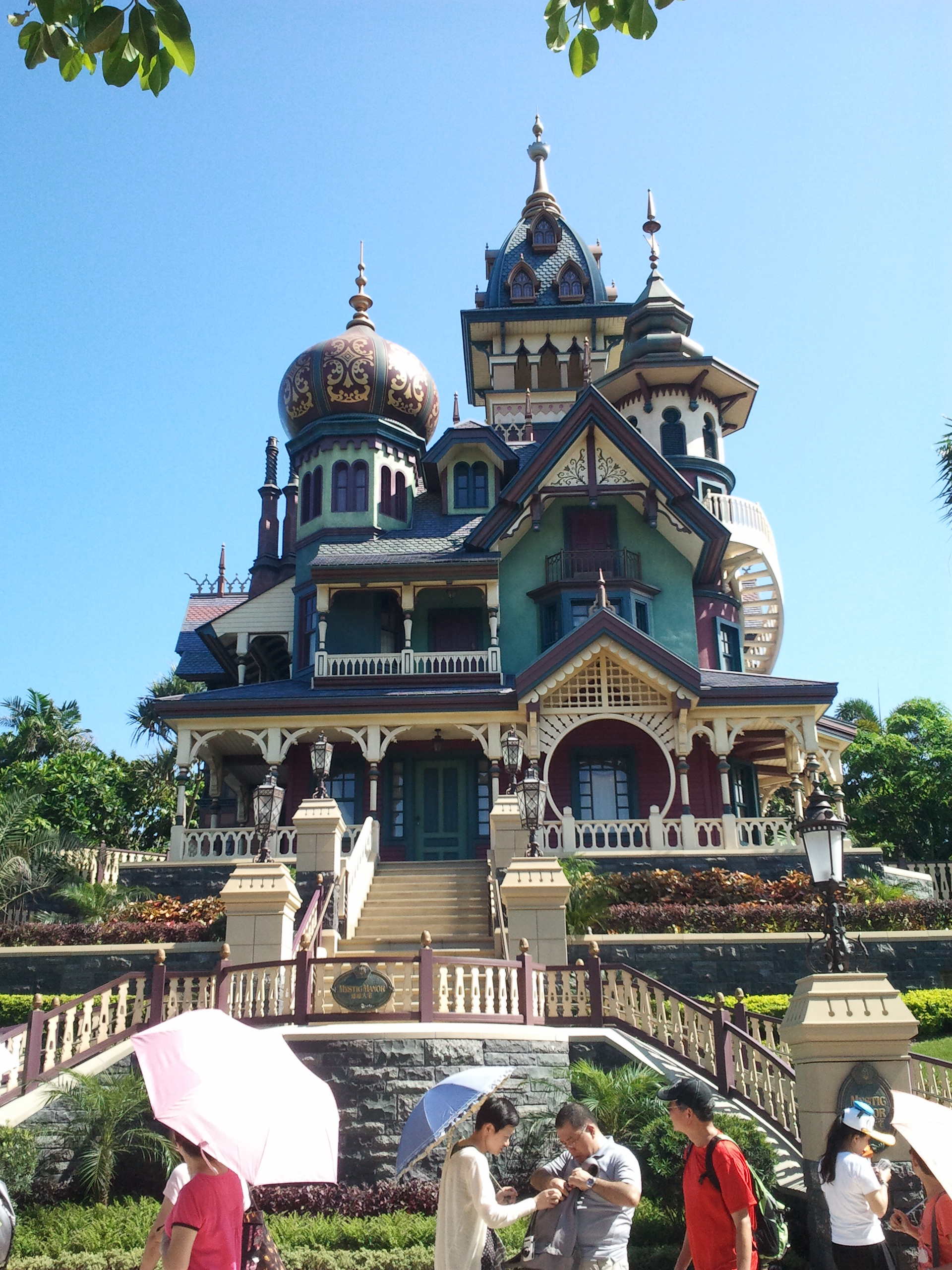

Hong Kong Disneyland
- Area: Mystic Point
- Coordinates: 22.309758°N 114.041175°E
- Status: Operating
- Opening date: May 17, 2013; 13 years ago

Ride statistics
- Attraction type: Trackless dark ride
- Designer: Walt Disney Imagineering
- Music: Danny Elfman
- Capacity: 1,440 riders per hour
- Vehicle type: Mystic Magneto electric carriage
- Riders per vehicle: 6
- Rows: 2
- Riders per row: 3
- Duration: 5:30
- Wheelchair accessible

Mystic Manor (Chinese: 迷離大宅) is a dark ride attraction in the Mystic Point area of Hong Kong Disneyland. Unlike Disneyland's Haunted Mansion attraction and its counterparts in other Disney parks, Mystic Manor has a lighthearted, fantasy-based theme with no references to departed spirits or the afterlife, due to differences in traditional Chinese culture. The attraction does feature several references to the Haunted Mansion, such as a Medusa changing portrait, a conservatory, and the busts that turn to follow visitors as they move. References to other Disney attractions include several figures similar to those from The Enchanted Tiki Room in the Tribal Arts room.

== History ==
The Manor's exterior design is inspired by the now-demolished Bradbury Mansion that stood at 147 North Hill Street in Los Angeles' Bunker Hill, designed by Samuel Newsom and Joseph Cather Newsom of the firm Newsom and Newsom, who also designed the still-standing Carson Mansion in Eureka, California.

The attraction utilises a trackless ride system similar to that used in Pooh's Hunny Hunt. It features a musical score by Danny Elfman. Continuing the Society of Explorers and Adventurers theme of Tokyo DisneySea, Mystic Manor tells the story of Lord Henry Mystic and his monkey Albert. Having recently acquired an enchanted music box, Albert opens the box and brings everything inside the house to life.

Mystic Manor began previews in April 2013, and was officially opened to the public on May 17, 2013.

== Experience ==
=== Queue and pre-show ===
The queue starts at the gate of the manor—a large Victorian mansion in an elaborate Queen Anne architectural style combined with traditional Russian architecture. Guests enter from the side of the private residence and continue into the building. Inside, guests see a portrait of Lord Henry Mystic and Albert, Henry's pet monkey. Other pictures in the queue show how Henry met Albert, rescuing him from a large spider; the ribbon-cutting of Mystic Point in 1896; and an 1899 group portrait of the Society of Explorers and Adventurers (including Harrison Hightower and Shiriki Utundu of Tokyo DisneySea's Tower of Terror and a separate portrait of Danny Elfman who composed a Musical Score for the ride). Guests enter a pre-show area where they watch a slide show narrated by Henry Mystic. He gives a short speech about the exhibition rooms and his latest collections, emphasizing an enchanted music box which may possess magical properties. When Henry Mystic mentions the music box, Albert appears and expresses interest in it. After the presentation, guests enter the loading area and board the Mystic Magneto. Electric carriage Henry Mystic invented to take guests on a tour of the museum.

=== Ride experience ===
The first room, the Acquisitions and Cataloguing Room, is where Lord Mystic's collections are temporarily stored and await placement on shelves. The music box Lord Mystic mentioned is now in front of guests. Lord Mystic appears from a door in the middle of the room, looking for Albert. He greets the guests and acknowledges the music box before leaving to continue his search. Albert suddenly pops out and unlocks the box. The escaping magic dust floats in the air and brings life to all the artifacts.

In the Music Room, many exotic musical instruments are displayed. A harpsichord is placed in the center of the room. The magic dust gives life to instruments and music begins to play. The music follows the carriage and plays in the background for the remainder of the journey. Albert watches in fascination from atop a large pipe organ, curious to visit the rest of the manor.

In the room for Mediterranean Antiquities, paintings, ceramics, and Audio-Animatronic statues start to move under the influence of the magic. The carriages first pass a painting portraying four people outside with a volcano visible in the background. As the magic affects the painting, the volcano erupts, submerging the people in lava, who then clink their glasses. The lava falls off of the scene to restart the animation for the next viewer. An amphora with Hercules actually fighting the Nemean lion spins and rocks when the carriage passes, and Hercules jumps above the lion and fights; the painting on the amphora is animated. The carriages then pass a large painting of Medusa who morphs into a Gorgon, and her eyes flash before turning back to the woman. This painting is a reference to the other Haunted Mansion attractions, which contain portraits of Medusa changing to and from a Gorgon.

In the Solarium Room, Albert curiously points his finger near the mouth of a Venus flytrap. A larger one faces the riders and roars loudly, lightning crashes, and the room becomes pitch black. Soon afterward, the carriage enters the Slavic-Nordic Chamber, containing the 17th century painting Russia Spring. Suddenly, the Slavic God of Winter, Stribog, casts a blizzard, and freezes over the painting. The freezing wind actually leaves the painting and spreads ice throughout the entire room, finally gathering on a large mirror that shatters the guests' reflection.

The Arms & Armour room is full of weapons and armor that have come alive. First seen is a suit of samurai armor wielding a katana that tries to hack Albert's head off, but he dodges each slash with success, then a cannon opens fire on the guests which knocks the carriage back and sends it spinning away. The carriage passes through a hallway containing three suits of armor, their helmets floating next to their bodies and singing along with the music. The carriage then moves in front of a large medieval crossbow on a stand, which loads and takes aim at the guests, the carriage narrowly dodging its shot, knocking them into the next room. On the other side of the room, a Mongolian suit of armor can be seen holding a few helmets aloft and laughing evilly.

In a swift move, guests enter the Egyptian Antiquities room, where a sarcophagus glows an unearthly green as swarms of scarabs emerge from it, to which the sarcophagus' face turns scared before being covered. The scarabs cover all the lights and guests are stuck riding through the darkness.

The guests reached the end of the darkness and reach the Tribal Arts rooms, where a large tiki figure dominates the room, spewing lava from its mouth. Two tiki poles stand on either side, as well as multiple other tiki statues. The room is full of chanting and tribal drums, all in tune with the music. Three tiki statues rotate and aim arrows and blow dart guns, which reveals Albert pinned to the opposite wall, stuck but unharmed by their ammunition.

Then the carriages goes into the Chinese Salon where a giant jade Sun Wukong statue is brought to life and uses its staff to create a tornado, making the room spin and causing all the paintings in the salon to break apart and fall down. The vehicles continuously circle the room during this scene. Albert appears on a wall and the statue tries to hit him with a lightning bolt. This only succeeds in blowing away a portion of the wall, which crumbles, showing the dusty sky. Albert is then blown away from the manor and manages to hold onto a large harp as the enchanted music box suddenly appears. Albert jumps onto the box as the carriages move back to the Acquisitions and Cataloguing Room.

The music climaxes as the magic flies back into the music box. Albert slams the lid shut and breathes a sigh of relief as the lights come back on, revealing a perfectly normal room. Lord Mystic then appears behind Albert, happy to have finally found him. He asks if Albert touched the music box, which Albert immediately denies. Wondering as to whether the legends regarding it are true, Lord Mystic thanks the guests for touring his home and bids them farewell as the vehicles move back into the station.

== Ride system ==
The attraction's 37 Mystic Magneto electric carriages are automated guided vehicles that can travel freely throughout the mansion, receiving directional instruction via radio-frequency identification technology in the floor and Wi-Fi. Thirty five of them are standard vehicles holding up to 6 guests. The 36th and 37th are specially modified to carry a wheelchair and an accompanying person. The carriages travel in groups of four, each group following a unique path influenced by its most recent loading position. Because the carriages are not restricted to a single path, the handicapped carriages can be easily rotated in and out of a group. Riders experience 40 ultra-high-definition images created by 36 projectors. The attraction is one of Hong Kong Disneyland's most complex.

Each Mystic Magneto electric carriage operates at a speed of 4 km per hour. For safety reasons, if a guest stands while a carriage is in motion, it stops immediately.

== Voice cast ==
- Stephen Stanton as Lord Henry Mystic
- Frank Welker as Albert / Roaring Plant
- Danny Elfman as Singing Helmets (English)

== Awards ==
In November 2013, Mystic Manor received the "Award for Outstanding Achievement – Attraction" from Themed Entertainment Association (THEA).

== See also ==
- Phantom Manor
- Jumanji
