= The Haunted Mansion =

Disney dark ride attraction

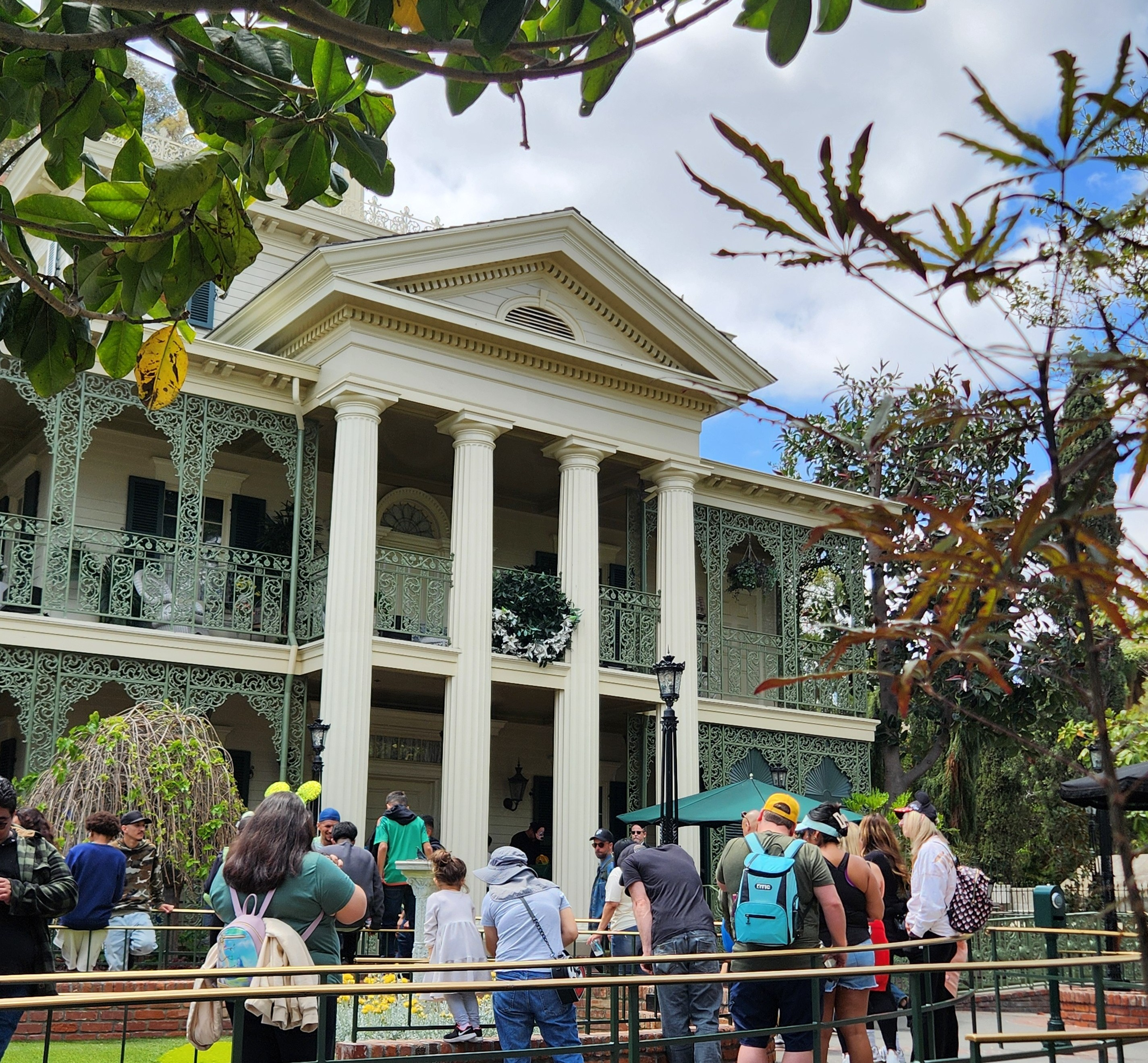
- Attraction's facade at Disneyland

Disneyland
- Area: New Orleans Square
- Status: Operating
- Opening date: August 9, 1969
- Lightning Lane available

Magic Kingdom
- Area: Liberty Square
- Status: Operating
- Opening date: October 1, 1971
- Lightning Lane available

Tokyo Disneyland
- Area: Fantasyland
- Status: Operating
- Opening date: April 15, 1983

Ride statistics
- Attraction type: Dark ride
- Manufacturer: Arrow Development
- Designer: WED Enterprises; Walt Disney Imagineering
- Theme: Haunted attraction
- Music: "Grim Grinning Ghosts" composed by Buddy Baker
- Height: 54 ft (16 m)
- Vehicle type: Omnimover, styled as "Doom Buggies"
- Riders per vehicle: 2–3
- Duration: 5:50–8:20
- Audio-Animatronics: 109
- Ride host: Ghost Host: voiced by Paul Frees in California & Florida; Teichiro Hori in Tokyo.
- Seasonal Overlay: Ghost Host: voiced by Corey Burton in California; Ponta Mitsui in Tokyo.
- Must transfer from wheelchair
- Assistive listening available

The Haunted Mansion is a horror/thriller themed dark ride attraction located at Disneyland, Magic Kingdom and Tokyo Disneyland. This haunted house-based attraction features a ride-through tour in Omnimover vehicles called "Doom Buggies" and a walk-through show is displayed to the queue line. Each location differs slightly in design, utilizing a range of technology from centuries-old theatrical effects to modern special effects, including Audio-Animatronics.

The ride was in development for over a decade after Disneyland opened and was one of the last projects begun under Walt Disney's direction. The Haunted Mansion inspired two loosely similar but distinct attractions, Phantom Manor and Mystic Manor, at Disneyland Park (Paris) and Hong Kong Disneyland, respectively. Franchise media includes television specials, merchandise, comic strips and a pair of feature films; The Haunted Mansion released in 2003 and Haunted Mansion released in 2023.

== Ride summary ==
=== Disneyland ===
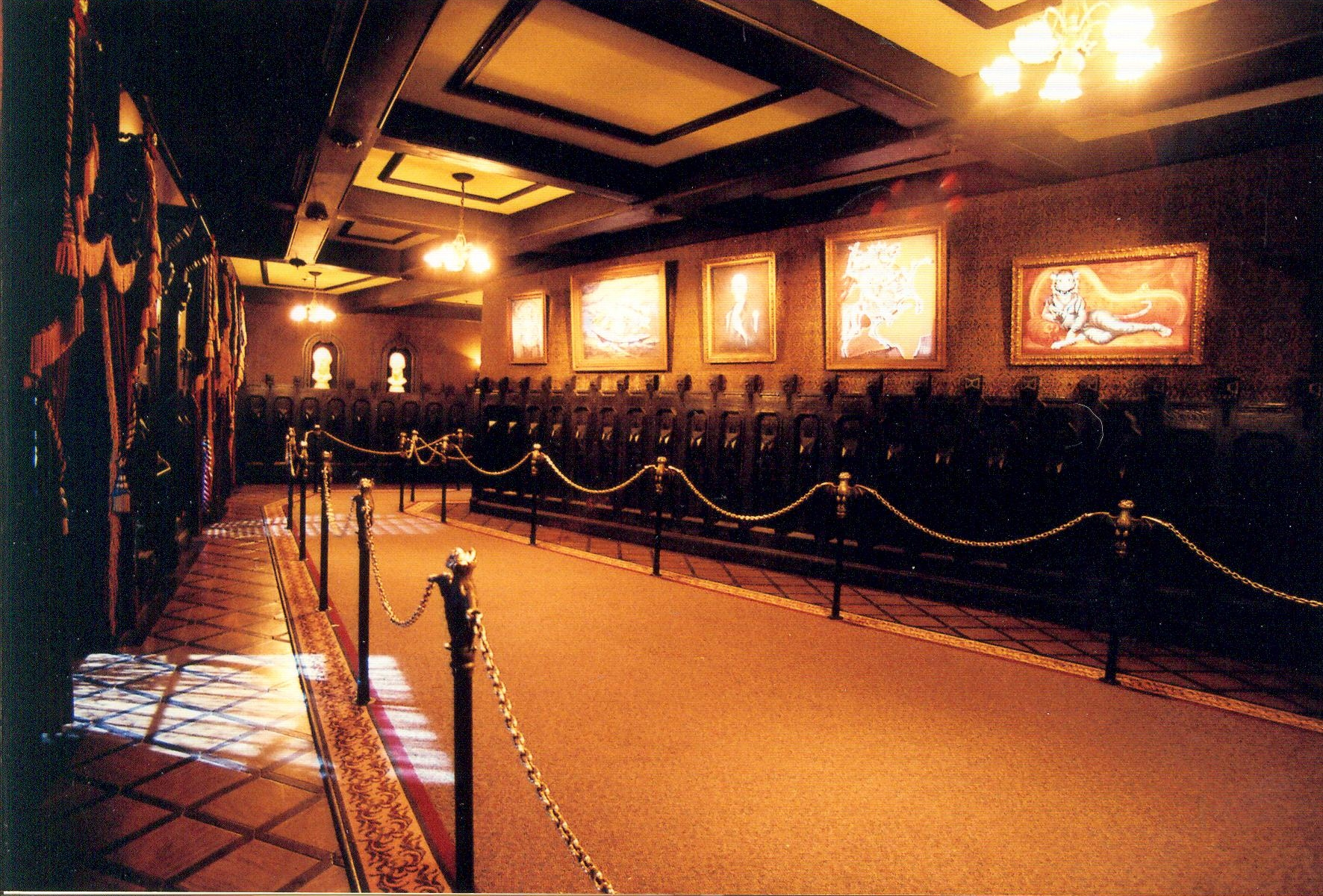
The hall of portraits that guests see as they exit the stretching room at Disneyland.

Guests enter the grounds of the antebellum mansion through its front gate and walk through the gardens containing a pet cemetery and a carriage led by an invisible horse. Already an instrumental of the ride's theme song, "Grim Grinning Ghosts", can be heard. Once inside the mansion's foyer, the deep voice of the invisible Ghost Host (voiced by Disney Legend Paul Frees) introduces himself.

A wall opens up and the Ghost Host leads guests into an octagon shaped art gallery. This room contains a quartet of paintings, each depicting a person from the chest up. The wall closes behind the guests and the room stretches vertically. As it does, the portrait frames appear to elongate, revealing the subjects' grim but humorous fates. This iconic Stretching Room is actually an elevator used to transport guests underneath the railroad berm to where the main attraction is located. The Ghost Host challenges guests to "find a way out" and cackles, commenting, "Of course, there's always my way" as the room goes dark. The ceiling vanishes and lightning flashes to reveal the cupola, in which hangs the Ghost Host's skeletal remains from the rafters by a noose. The room goes dark again, a shriek is heard, followed by the sound of bones shattering. The Ghost Host apologizes for frightening the guests "prematurely" as the lights dimly return and a wall opens.

The Ghost Host leads guests into a portrait corridor connecting the Stretching Room to the loading area. This corridor is actually a tunnel that passes under Disneyland Railroad and connects the facade to the ride building, where the actual ride takes place. The subjects of the portraits on the right flicker briefly into macabre versions of themselves when lightning flashes from the windows on the left. The Ghost Host notes "we have 999 happy haunts here" with "room for 1000". At the end of the corridor are two busts who appear to "follow" the guests with their gazes due to the Hollow-Face illusion. In the loading area, black carriages called "Doom Buggies" descend one staircase and ascend another to the second floor, while fog is pumped into the back of the room. While most guests load their Doom Buggies via a moving carpet synced to the Doom Buggies, the carpets and Doom Buggies are frozen when loading and unloading wheelchair bound guests. There is also a brightly lit exit corridor accessible here acting as an official wheelchair exit, leading to an elevator back to the Mansion's entrance.

Once guests are loaded in their Doom Buggies, they ascend to the upper floor as the Ghost Host gives a bilingual safety spiel. Guests then pass by a candelabra floating down an endless hallway. Near the hallway's entrance is a moving suit of armor and a chair with an abstract face. The Doom Buggies then turn to view a glass conservatory filled with dead flora where a funeral is set up. Inside a casket, a zombie is heard calling out for help to escape; his bony hands are seen trying to pry the casket lid open. The Doom Buggies then travel down a hallway of doors where pounding, calls for help, screams, knocking, and maniacal laughter can be heard from behind the doors. Knockers and handles move independently, and some doors appear to "breath." A demonic grandfather clock chimes thirteen as the minute hand spins backwards and the shadow of a claw passes over it.

Guests enter a dark séance room that contains occult objects. Madame Leota, a blue-haired medium whose disembodied head appears within a levitating crystal ball, summons the Mansion's spirits. Floating musical instruments in the surrounding background respond in turn to her spell.

The séance circle is followed by a mezzanine overlooking a spacious ballroom where many ghosts enjoy a birthday party. Ghosts fly into the room from a crashed hearse and the windows. Several ghosts sit at the table where one blows out the candles of a birthday cake. When the ghost girl blows out the candles, the other ghosts seated at the table disappear, then reappear when she "inhales" again. Playing on the chandelier over the dining table are several drunken ghosts holding glasses of red wine. Six ghost couples waltz to music played by a gentleman's spirit on a pipe organ; several wraiths fly out of its pipes as the haunting refrain echoes throughout the scene. Hanging on the wall are the portraits of two duelists who come to life and fire their revolvers at each other. This Ballroom Scene is the most famous and elaborate use of the "Pepper's Ghost" illusion in popular culture.

Guests enter the attic filled with portraits and wedding gifts. In each portrait, the same bride is seen with a different groom, who disappears only to reappear a moment later. Guests then see the shadow of a pianist playing a sinister version of the "Bridal March". Nearby is the ghost of the bride, Constance Hatchaway, holding the same candelabra seen earlier as she floats while her heart glows pinkish red and beats in time with the music. Sitting next to her is an ominous one-eyed cat.

The Doom Buggies drift out of an attic window and onto a balcony towards the Hatbox Ghost amidst a starry night sky. They then fall backward underneath dead trees bearing humanoid faces. Reaching the ground, they turn towards the gate of a private cemetery, where a frightened caretaker holds a lantern and a shovel with his scrawny dog whimpering in fear at his feet. Around the corner, ghosts have risen from their graves and are partying enthusiastically. Ghouls also pop up from behind the gravestones, some of which appear to move. In the graveyard are multiple comical sights, such as a skeleton's hand popping out of a hole in a tomb, a duo of ghosts singing opera, a king and queen balancing a seesaw on a gravestone and a duchess sipping a cup of tea. Throughout the scene, five busts sing "Grim Grinning Ghosts" alongside the Phantom Five--a ghost band consisting of a lyrist, a trumpeter, a floutist, a bagpiper, and a percussionist using bones for drumsticks--and the other ghosts of the graveyard singing in chorus. Near the end of the graveyard, the candelabra floats by once more.

The Doom Buggies enter a large crypt where the Ghost Host warns guests about hitchhiking ghosts as the vehicles pass a group of three ghosts thumbing for a ride. Around the corner, in large mirrors, the guests see that one of the ghosts from the trio is in the buggy with them. The guests then disembark their Doom Buggies and begin to leave the mansion. As guests ride an escalator back to the surface, a small ghost known as Little Leota encourages them to "hurry back".

=== Magic Kingdom ===
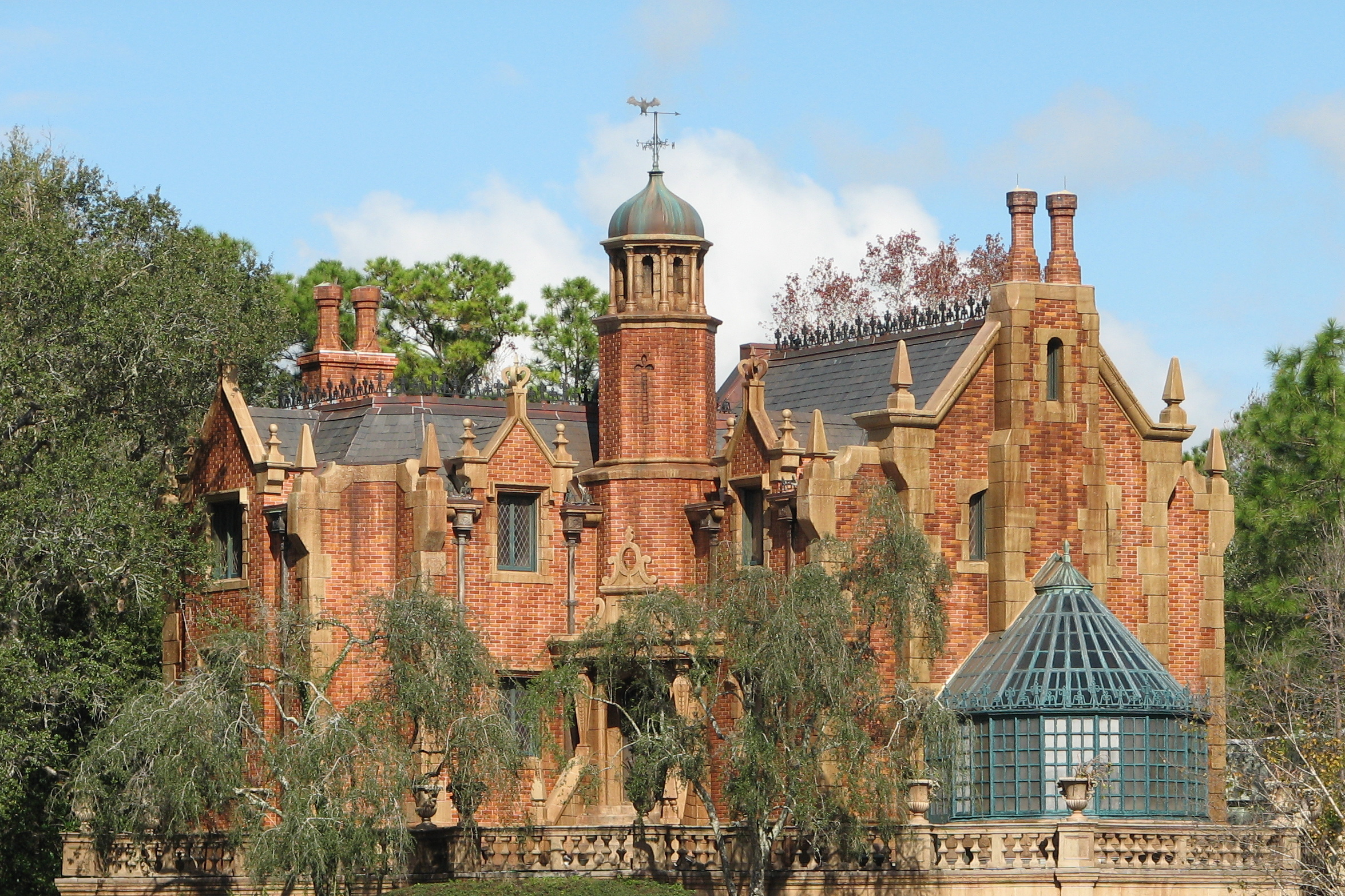
The Magic Kingdom version features a Gothic revival-style.

The Haunted Mansion was an opening-day attraction at Magic Kingdom in Walt Disney World, where it is part of Liberty Square. During the production and assembly of the props and audio-animatronics for Disneyland's Haunted Mansion, duplicates of everything were being made for Walt Disney World's Haunted Mansion. It was decided that the Florida version of the attraction would be slightly longer and more elaborate than its California counterpart with extra scenes such as the library and the music room. Paul Frees recorded additional voice-overs, including dialogue as the "Ghost Host", to accompany the extra scenes in the ride. Because of the ample space within the park, the attraction's show building is much larger and not restricted by any railroad berm.

In the Foyer, there is a portrait of the Aging Man from the Disneyland version. Unlike its Disneyland counterpart, the stretching rooms are not elevators and instead have the ceilings rise. After this, the door opens to the Doom Buggy loading area.

Upon boarding, guests pass under the staircase, with a candelabra floating above, then pass the changing portraits as seen in the queue at Disneyland. An on-ride photo is taken in this section. Then the guests go through the library where busts of ghost writers stare and follow them when they pass by as also seen in the queue at Disneyland. Once they enter the music room, an invisible pianist plays a sinister version of “Grim Grinning Ghosts” and into the Endless Staircase, where footprints can be seen and candelabras are blown out occasionally by unseen ghosts.

Passing by bat-eyed wallpaper that glows in the dark, the guests see the Endless Hallway, but the Hatbox Ghost appears next to it from a blue door, his footprints visible in front of the Hallway. The conservatory and corridor of doors are similar to the California counterparts.

In the seance room, Madame Leota is seen floating and reciting her spell as instruments play. A green specter floats alongside the instruments. The Doom Buggies enter a ballroom scene near identical to California before proceeding to the attic. Here, the piano player can be heard, but not seen. Florida's bride character, Constance Hatchaway, gleefully recites twisted wedding vows and threateningly holds a hatchet. Voiced by Kat Cressida (who's best known for voicing Dee Dee in Dexter's Laboratory), Hatchaway is the inspiration for similar bride characters in Muppets Haunted Mansion and the theatrical 2023 film.

The Doom Buggies pass through the cemetery, where many of the ghosts are singing Grim Grinning Ghosts and into the crypt, where the Hitchhiking Ghosts are playing around in the mirrors. Little Leota appears above the vehicles as guests disembark and pass a mausoleum and then a pet cemetery.

=== Tokyo Disneyland ===
The Tokyo Disneyland version of the Haunted Mansion was an opening day attraction and is located in Fantasyland. This version is largely a duplicate of the Magic Kingdom version as it ran throughout the 20th century, without the changes it received during its 2007 refurbishment. Minor differences include a haunted painting of a man vaguely resembling Peter Lorre whose face pops out and stretches, a tall, legless ghost in the Séance Room, and more advanced lighting. To those unfamiliar with the Florida ride before its 2007 refurbishment, the most notable differences from the American parks will be the absence of Florida's Endless Staircase scene and a unique attic scene. Tokyo's attic is a sparsely decorated, with pop-up ghosts scattered about and a more enigmatic bride character without any dialogue or background lore. This attic is faithful to how California and Florida's attic scenes appeared throughout the 90s and early 2000s.

== History ==
=== Development ===
The idea for the Mansion precedes Disneyland and WED Enterprises, dating to when Walt Disney hired the first of his Imagineers. At the time, the park they were developing the attraction for was supposed to be located across from the studios. In 1951, the first known illustration of the park showed a main street setting, green fields, western village and carnival. Disney Legend Harper Goff developed a black-and-white sketch of a crooked street leading away from main street by a peaceful church and graveyard, with a run-down manor perched high on a hill that towered over main street.

Disney assigned Imagineer Ken Anderson to create a story using Goff's idea. Plans were made to build a New Orleans-themed land in the small transition area between Frontierland and Adventureland. Weeks later, New Orleans Square appeared on the souvenir map and promised a thieves' market, a pirate wax museum, and a haunted house walk-through. Anderson studied New Orleans and old plantations, landing on an image of the Shipley-Lydecker House in Baltimore, Maryland. He came up with a drawing of an antebellum manor with features from the Baltimore house, overgrown with weeds, dead trees, swarms of bats and boarded doors and windows topped by a screeching cat as a weathervane.

Disney, however, rejected the idea of having a run-down building in his park. He visited the Winchester Mystery House in San Jose, California, and was captivated by the massive mansion with its stairs to nowhere, doors that opened to walls and holes, and elevators. Anderson envisioned stories for the mansion, including tales of a ghostly sea captain who killed his nosy bride and then hanged himself, a mansion home to an unfortunate family, and a ghostly wedding party with well-known Disney villains and spooks.

In 1961, handbills announcing a 1963 opening of the Haunted Mansion were given out at Disneyland's main entrance. Construction began a year later, and the exterior was completed in 1963. The attraction was previewed in a 1965 episode of Walt Disney's Wonderful World of Color, but the attraction itself did not open until 1969. The six-year delay owed heavily to Disney's involvement in the New York World's Fair in 1964–1965 and to an attraction redesign after Disney's death in 1966.

After the fair, many Imagineers such as Marc Davis, X Atencio and Claude Coats contributed ideas to the project. By this time, Anderson had left the project. Rolly Crump showed Disney some designs for his version, which included bizarre objects like coffin clocks, candle men, talking chairs, man-eating plants, tiki-like busts, living gypsy wagons and a mirror with a face. Disney accepted these ideas and wanted to make the proclaimed "Museum of the Weird", a restaurant side to the now-named Haunted Mansion, similar to the Blue Bayou at Pirates of the Caribbean. However, Crump denies this claim in a 2021 interview in SFGATE.

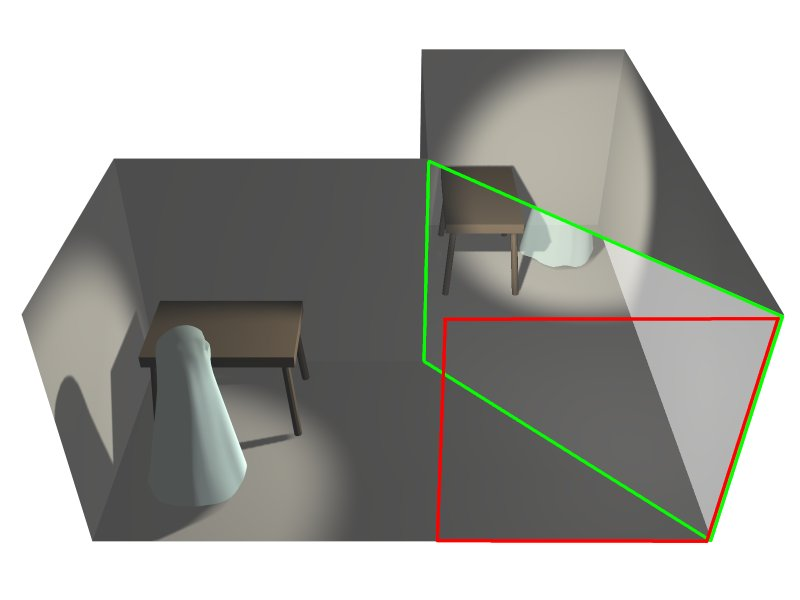
An example of the Pepper's ghost technique used to project transparent items

When Disney put Imagineers Crump and Yale Gracey in charge of creating illusions for the attraction, they intended to make the "Museum of the Weird" into a separate section that guests could walk through, where they could see transparent ghosts and other apparitions utilizing the Pepper's ghost technique used in the theater since the early 1800s. Crump and Gracey were eventually given a large workshop to develop their ideas. One night, the two Imagineers decided to play a prank on the night cleaning crew. As Crump explained:

We got a call from personnel saying that the janitors requested that we leave the lights on in there due to the creepiness of all the audio-animatronic ghosts and such. We complied, but put motion sensors in the room that would extinguish the lights and turn on all the ghost effects when triggered. The next morning, we came in and found all the ghost effects still running and a broom lying in the center of the floor. Personnel called and said that the janitors would not be back.

Davis and Coats, two of the Mansion's main designers, disagreed on whether the ride should be frightening or funny. Coats, originally a background artist, wanted a scary adventure, and produced renditions of moody surroundings like endless hallways, corridors of doors, and bleakly spooky environments. Davis, an animator and character designer, proposed a variety of mostly comical characters, and thought the ride should be silly and full of gags. In the end, both artists got their ways when Atencio combined their approaches and ideas, creating a transition from dark foreboding to "spirited" entertainment. The ride narration was performed by Paul Frees in the role of the Ghost Host. The attraction's theme song, "Grim Grinning Ghosts", was composed by Buddy Baker with lyrics by Atencio. Different versions of it can be heard in nearly every area of the ride.

After Disney's death in December 1966, the project evolved significantly. The Museum of the Weird restaurant idea was abandoned. The Imagineers objected to a walk-through attraction's low capacity, going so far as suggesting building two identical attractions to accommodate twice as many guests. A solution appeared with the development of the Omnimover system for Adventure Thru Inner Space. Renamed the Doom Buggy, the system's continuous chain of semi-enclosed vehicles offered high capacity. The cars could be set to rotate in any direction at any point, allowing the Imagineers to control what guests saw and heard. Because each car held from one to three people, it was a convenient way to divide guests into smaller groups—a better fit with the story of people wandering alone through a haunted house.

=== Debut ===
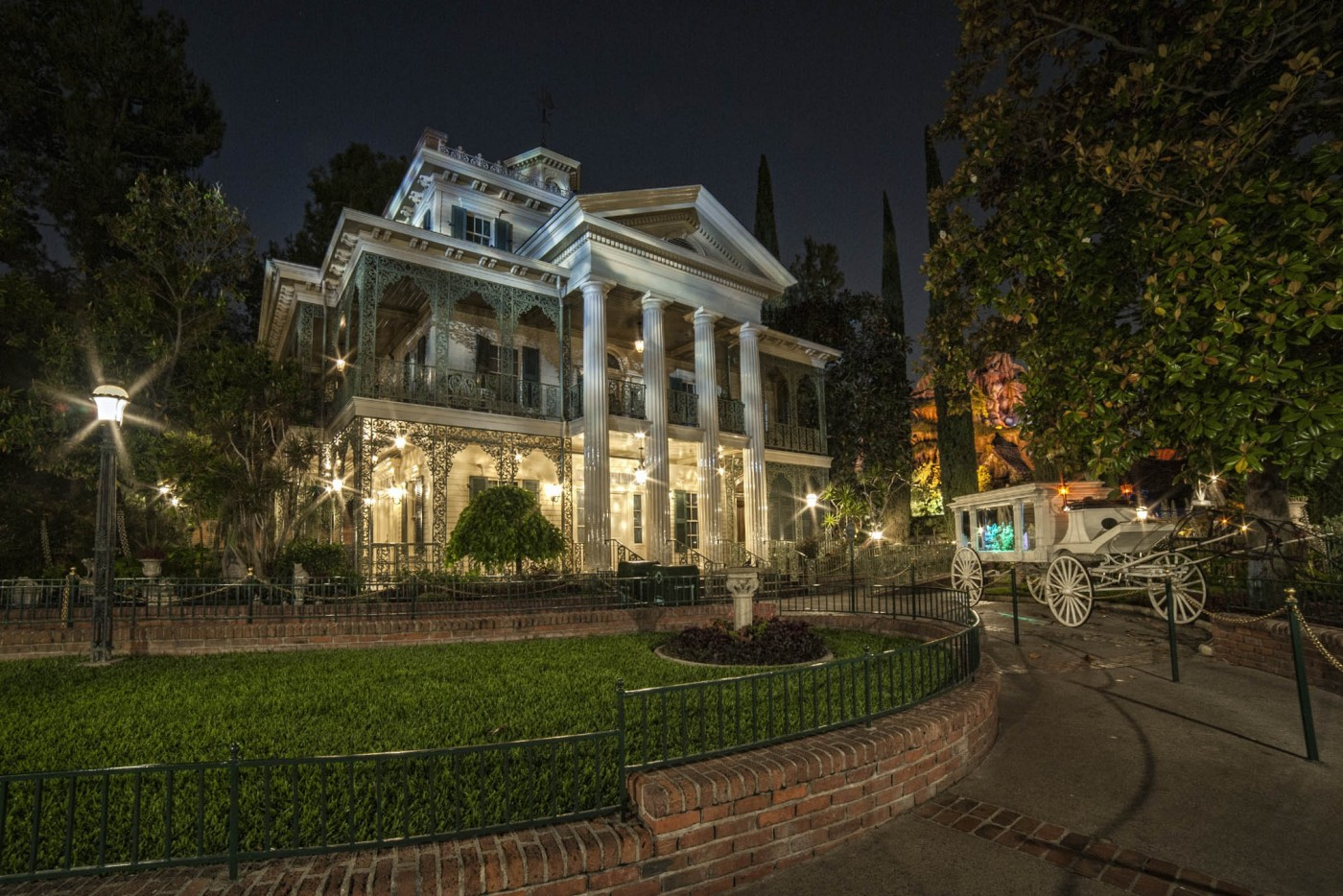
Disneyland attraction's exterior in the evening in 2014.

Employee previews of the Mansion were held August 6, 7, and the 8th, followed by "soft" openings on August 9 and 10 where limited numbers of park guests were allowed to ride. A "Midnight" Press Event was held on the evening of August 11. The Mansion opened to all guests on August 12, 1969.

In around 1977, WDI considered utilizing the unused designs, creatures and effects that Rolly Crump had originally created for the Haunted Mansion and the Museum of the Weird as part of Professor Marvel's Gallery—"a tent show of mysteries and delights, a carousel of magic and wonder," to be built as part of Disneyland's Discovery Bay expansion area. The idea was dropped when the expansion's plans fell through.

=== Updates ===
In 1994, Disneyland's Haunted Mansion was updated. A phantom piano player sat at a run-down piano in the attic scene, and the original faceless bride was given a full-fleshed appearance. In 2001, a newer, more-detailed safety spiel was added to the Doom Buggies' onboard audio as they left the loading area. Recorded by voice-over artist Joe Leahy in English and Fabio Rodriguez in Spanish, in a recreation of the character of original actor Paul Frees' Ghost Host, the bilingual spiel was part of a park-wide campaign to increase safety. The seasonal overlay Haunted Mansion Holiday also premiered in October, featuring characters from the 1993 film The Nightmare Before Christmas.

In 2004, California's Seance Room was updated so the crystal ball with the talking head of Madame Leota floated above its table rather than sitting stationary on it, with the original projection-mapped effect replaced by a rear-projection effect within the ball. In 2006, the original attic bride was replaced by Constance Hatchaway and her unique storyline.

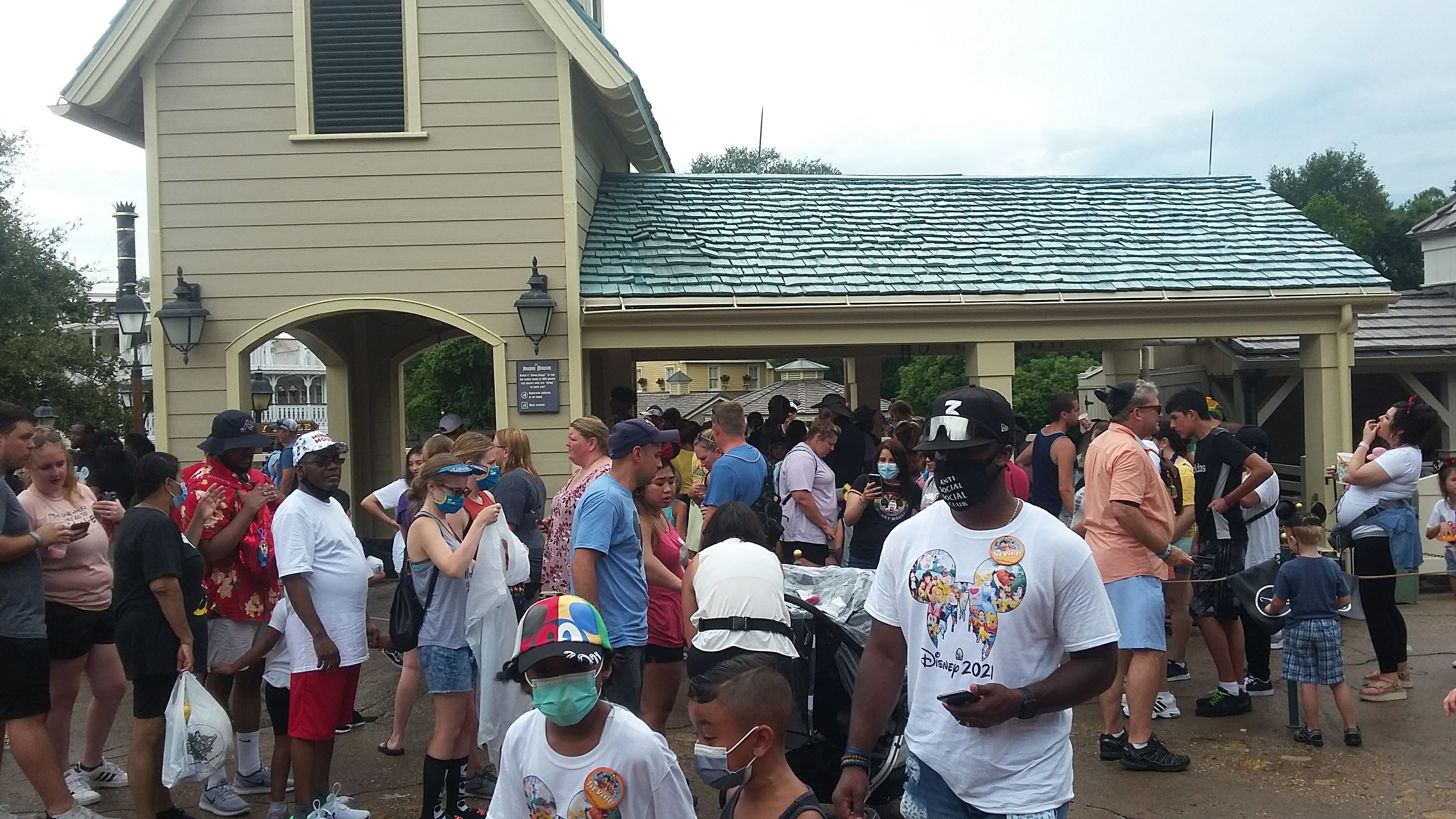
The extended queue line at Magic Kingdom.

In 2007, the Florida attraction was renovated, with changes including the installation of the changing portraits and lightning-filled windows from the Disneyland version, and new vocals for most of the ghosts in the graveyard. An endless staircase scene was added in place of a previously dark space with spider webs. The portrait hall was originally decorated with portraits, known as the Sinister 11, situated on both sides and on a doorway, all of which have eyes that stared at guests as they pass through; these were later transferred to the load area during the refurbishment and their eyes no longer followed guests.

In March 2011, a new "interactive queue" debuted at the Walt Disney World location, with new crypts and tombstones honoring Imagineers; a murder mystery for guests to solve featuring the sinister Dread Family; the Composer Crypt, which features musical instruments that play variations of "Grim Grinning Ghosts" when touched, including a pipe organ made by the fictional "Ravenscroft" company, named for Thurl Ravenscroft, one of the vocalists for "Grim Grinning Ghosts"; the Mariner's brine-filled sepulcher, whose ghost sings and sneezes from within, and a crypt for Prudence Pock the poetess, which features haunted moving books and Prudence's ghost writing invisibly in her poem book. Guests can solve the unfinished poems by speaking into microphones located on the crypt. The FastPass+ line skips the queue altogether and leads guests straight to the Foyer doors. There is also an extended queue line that uses the former Mike Fink Keel Boats dock.

On April 10, 2015, it was officially confirmed that an iconic Haunted Mansion character, The Hatbox Ghost, would return to Disneyland's Haunted Mansion. The character returned on May 9, 2015. The Hatbox Ghost was originally a part of the attraction when it opened in 1969, but was removed when the illusion involving the specter's head was not convincing enough. The Hatbox Ghost was added to Disney World's Haunted Mansion on November 30, 2023, as part of The Walt Disney Company's 100th Anniversary celebration.

On April 2, 2019, PhotoPass ride photography was added to the attraction at Magic Kingdom. A hidden camera takes pictures of the riders as the doom buggy passes the final portrait in the portrait gallery, with the flash disguised as flickering lightning. A black and white photo featuring the riders framed by several of the ghosts surrounding the photo is automatically added to the guests' PhotoPass account by reading the RFID data from the guest's second-generation MagicBand.

On January 21, 2020, Disneyland's Haunted Mansion was closed for an extensive refurbishment to add lighted steel panels, improved lighting, mechanical touch-ups, and new paint and trims to the exterior of the attraction. The changes were originally scheduled for completion in spring 2020, but an extended park closure due to the COVID-19 pandemic created uncertainty. It was later confirmed that the refurbished attraction would reopen with the park on April 30, 2021. This refurbishment came with a refreshed pet cemetery, now with new greenery and plants. The portrait gallery was given new drapes and the loading area received more decorative wallpaper and the return of one of the Haunted Mansion's original portraits being "April to December". Also featuring a statue of the one-eyed cat. The rest of the attraction was given repairs and new lighting. In addition, a new secret entrance was added to the ride by using an exit. Once the crypt door opened, visitors would be directed down a flight of stairs and through a utility passageway usually used by cast members.

In January 2024, the Disneyland Haunted Mansion began another extensive refurbishment to reform and expand the outdoor queue, modify the nearby Magnolia Park in New Orleans Square, and add a gift shop at the ride's exit. The expansion opened on November 26, 2024; the new grounds include an accessible elevator while the gift shop, which is themed to be the mansion's carriage house, opened on December 23, 2024.

In January 2025, the attraction at Disneyland received a new bride inspired by the original version of the character and her storyline. In addition, the hitchhiking ghosts scene was updated.

== Other versions ==
=== Haunted Mansion Holiday ===
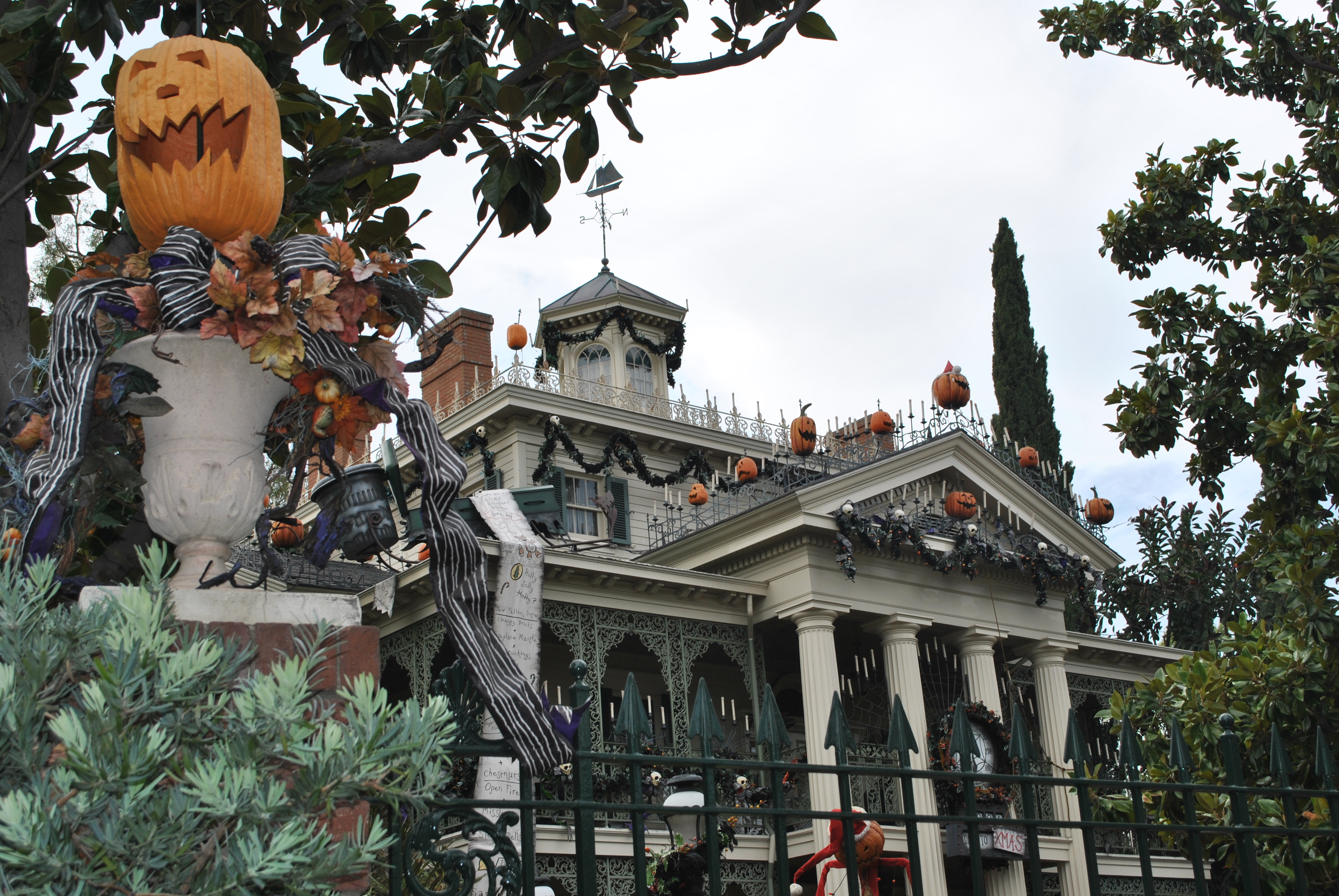
Disneyland's Haunted Mansion Holiday in October 2015

The Haunted Mansion at Disneyland and Tokyo Disneyland is transformed into Haunted Mansion Holiday during the Halloween and Christmas seasons and has been since 2001, inspired by Tim Burton's 1993 film The Nightmare Before Christmas. The Haunted Mansion is closed in mid-August for a few weeks as they revamp the attraction before opening again in late August, replacing many of the props and Audio-Animatronics with characters and themes from the movie. The Haunted Mansion Holiday closes in early January to restore the attraction back to the original Haunted Mansion and reopens late January.

The Magic Kingdom does not have its own holiday edition of the Haunted Mansion and the regular ride operates continuously through the holiday season.

=== Related attractions ===
Phantom Manor at Disneyland Park Paris

Disneyland Park Paris features Phantom Manor. Located in Frontierland, it is a re-imagined version of the Haunted Mansion. The house is a Western Victorian, in the Second Empire architectural style, based on the look of the Fourth Ward School House in Virginia City, Nevada. Along with the Western architectural style, the attraction uses a Western plot to fit in with the Thunder Mesa and Frontierland backdrop. Unlike the Disneyland and Magic Kingdom attractions which have English narration from Paul Frees, Phantom Manor features Vincent Price throughout.

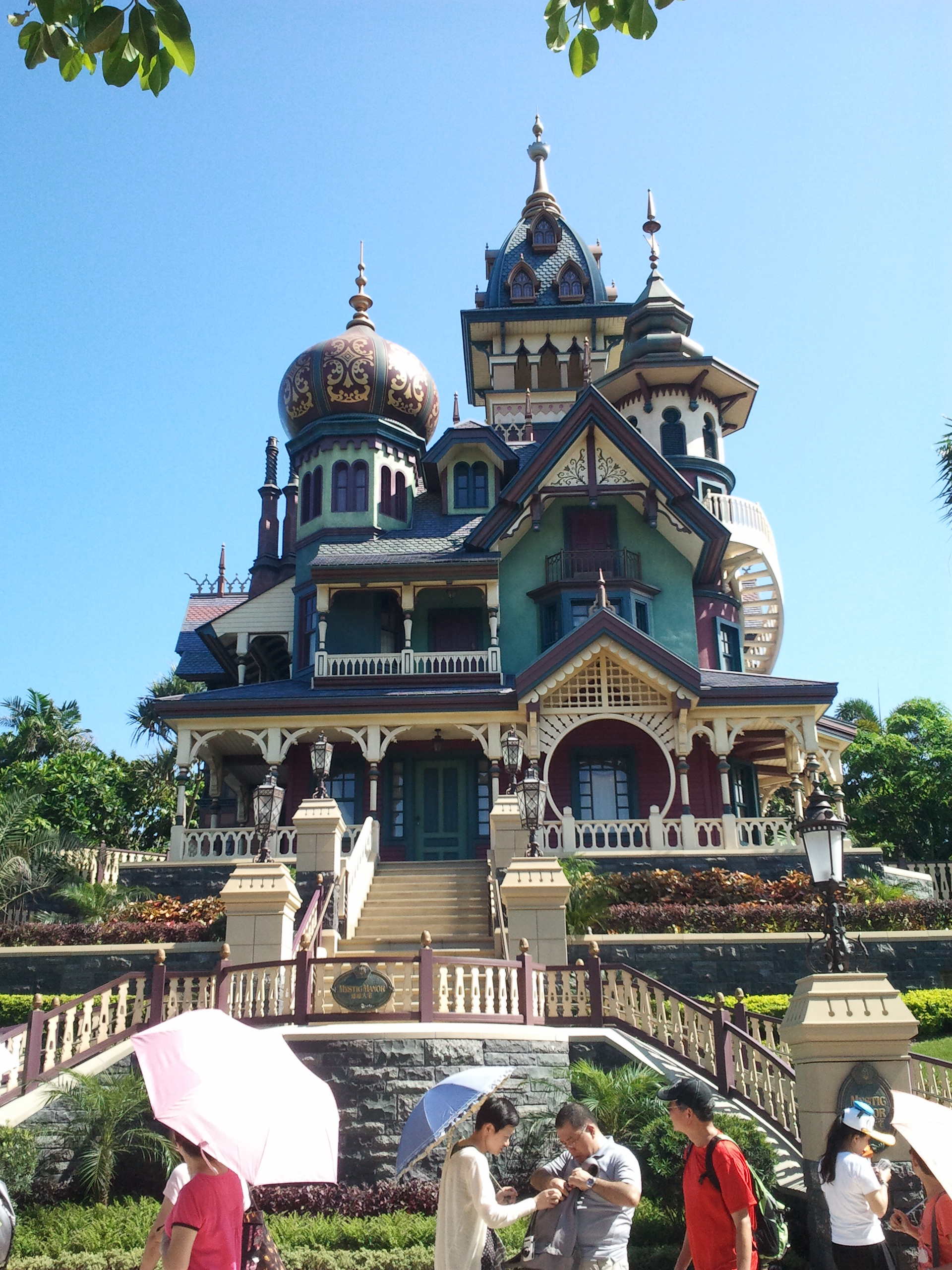
Mystic Manor at Hong Kong Disneyland

Mystic Manor opened at Hong Kong Disneyland in spring 2013, and is located in Mystic Point. Unlike the Haunted Mansion or Phantom Manor, however, it does not include references to departed spirits or the afterlife, due to differences in traditional Chinese culture. Based on the Society of Explorers and Adventurers mythos introduced in Tokyo DisneySea, the attraction tells the story of Lord Henry Mystic and his monkey Albert. Having recently acquired an enchanted music box with the power to bring inanimate objects to life, Albert opens the box and brings all of the house's artifacts to life. The attraction's exterior is that of a large Victorian mansion in an elaborate Queen Anne architectural style, and the experience features a trackless system and a musical score by Danny Elfman.

== Incidents ==
=== Disneyland ===
On October 5, 2025, a woman in her 60s was found unresponsive after riding The Haunted Mansion. Disneyland security administered CPR until Anaheim Fire and Rescue arrived. She was transported to a local hospital where she was pronounced dead. An autopsy was not performed, and no issues were found with the ride itself.

== Adaptations ==
Walt Disney Pictures produced two standalone theatrical live-action feature film adaptations based on the attraction:

The first adaptation, The Haunted Mansion, was directed by Rob Minkoff and starred Eddie Murphy was released on November 26, 2003.

The second adaptation, Haunted Mansion, was directed by Justin Simien and released on July 28, 2023. In July 2010, Guillermo del Toro announced that he was set to write and produce a darker film adaptation also based on the attraction, saying that it would be both scary and fun. The film was officially confirmed in July 2021, with Tiffany Haddish playing a hired psychic that attempts to commune with the dead and LaKeith Stanfield playing a lackluster tour guide in New Orleans's French Quarter.

== In popular culture ==
- In the 1970s, Lakeside introduced a "3-D board game" titled "Walt Disney World's Haunted Mansion Game". A unique feature of the game were dancing figures linked as gears which, when rotated, would change the map of the game into one of four layouts.
- In January 2014, Marvel Comics began publishing Seekers of the Weird, a five-issue miniseries and first under the Disney Kingdoms imprint. The miniseries was based on the Museum of the Weird, Rolly Crump's unused precursor designs for the attraction. In 2016 another miniseries was published under the same imprint, based on the haunted mansion itself.
- In July 2014, it was announced that Disney Television Animation was developing an animated special based on the attraction, the project originally was going to be helm by Phineas and Ferb writers Joshua Prett and Scott D. Peterson with Gris Grimly as art director and executive producer, the project was later re-developed as a potential mini-series for Disney XD with Shannon Tindle as executive producer but executive changes at Disney Branded Television in 2017 shelved the production.
- Madame Leota appears in the second half of the seventh season of ABC's Once Upon a Time, portrayed by Suzy Joachim.
- From 2016 to 2019, Disney Press released Tales from the Haunted Mansion, a four volume children's horror anthology series presented as selections from the Mansion's library. Narrated by Mansion librarian Amicus Arcane, the stories ranged from homages to classic horror to origin stories for different members of the Mansion's ensemble.
- In the 2018 film The Predator, the characters enter a large elevator room and a security guard recites part of the Haunted Mansion script "is this haunted room actually stretching?"
- In October 2018, it was reported that the Magic Kingdom was turning into a popular place for families to deposit ashes of their deceased loved ones, with the Haunted Mansion picked as their favorite location. Disney considers this to be unacceptable and unlawful, and stated that anyone caught doing so will be escorted from Disney property.
- The Bride, the Hatbox Ghost, the three Hitchhiking Ghosts, Madame Leota and Pickwick appear as playable characters in the video game Disney Magic Kingdoms, as limited time characters to unlock during Halloween Events, as well as both Disneyland and Magic Kingdom versions of The Haunted Mansion as attractions, and an attraction based on the Séance Circle.
- Funko Games partnered with Disney to release family strategy board game The Haunted Mansion – Call of the Spirits in 2020.
- Disney+ released the Muppets Halloween special Muppets Haunted Mansion in October 2021.
- The Haunted Mansion is part of Disney Television Animation short series Chibi Tiny Tales, the first one is a crossover with The Ghost and Molly McGee. The ghosts making an appearance in this Tiny Tale are Madame Leota, the blondette ghost girl from the ballroom scene, the Hatbox Ghost and Constance Hatchaway. Along with them are two specter waltzers, the ghost organist, the dueling portraits and the five marble busts from the graveyard finale scene.
- A Lego set based on the Haunted Mansion was released in 2022.
- Another Tiny Tale, released in 2023, revolves around the Mansion's groundskeeper (alongside his dog, who tries to tell him about the Happy Haunts after seeing one of them through a window while on the front porch). The Hatbox Ghost and the singing busts make another appearance in this Tiny Tale, along with the King and Queen, the Duke and Duchess, the singing minstrels, one of the cycling ghosts and the duo of opera singers.
- In 2023, Disney Television Animation released another The Ghost and Molly McGee crossover short, this time within the Random Rings shorts series using the show's artstyle, the short features Scratch calling the Mansion to see if there is space for him as part of the 999 Happy Haunts ghosts while getting rejected on the process, the short features the current voice actors of the attraction reprising their roles.
- In the season 3 Chibiverse short "Quackstreet Boys", Dewey from DuckTales, Scott Denoga from Hailey's On It!, Barry Buns from Kiff and Cricket Green from Big City Greens toured the Haunted Mansion.
