= Caught a Ghost =

American indie electro soul band based in Los Angeles, California

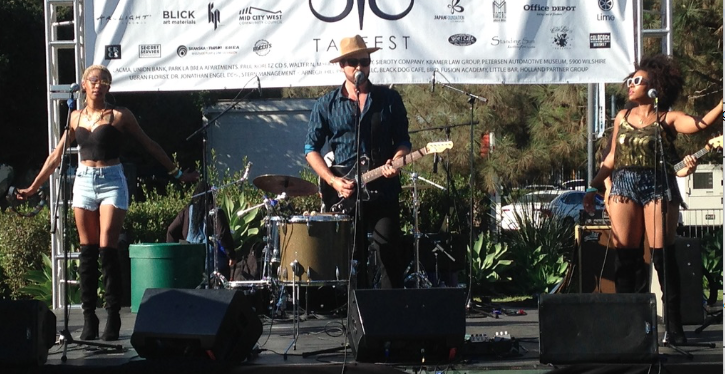
- Caught a Ghost at Tarfest, September 2018, Los Angeles, California

Background information
- Origin: Los Angeles, California
- Genres: R&B/soul
- Members: Jesse Nolan; Jazmen Safina; Jasmine N. Jamison
- Past members: Tessa Thompson
- Website: caughtaghost.com

Caught a Ghost is an indie electro soul band based in Los Angeles, California. The band is a project from Los Angeles singer, songwriter and producer Jesse Nolan and kindergarten classmate Stephen Edelstein. Their debut album, Human Nature, was released 1 April 2014.

== Career ==
Caught A Ghost is signed with +1 Records and released their debut full-length album, Human Nature, on 1 April 2014. The band has performed live to sold-out shows in Los Angeles, San Francisco and New York City. This included three national tours supporting fellow musicians Youngblood Hawke, Wild Belle and He's My Brother She's My Sister.

The band provided two songs for the Dear White People soundtrack. Caught A Ghost provided a remix to their song "Sleeping At Night" that was featured in the film's trailer. The band also produced a new song, "Get Your Life", for the film. Additionally, the song's music video was directed by Justin Simien (the director of Dear White People) and features the cast of the film.

== Style ==
The band identifies themselves as an indie electro soul band. Their sound is a modern take on blue-eyed soul; the tracks feature elements of classic Motown and Stax/Volt compositions with influences from dubstep, 1990s rap, and contemporary electronica.

The band's live shows often consist of an 8-piece band with 3-piece horn section and tailor-made projections for each song. The band engages the audience with mixed media, dancers, projected images, performance art, and audience participation.

== Film and television licensing ==
Several singles from the band's album, Human Nature, can be heard in Hollywood films and television series:

- Their song "No Sugar In My Coffee" was featured in Boardwalk Empire, Vampire Diaries, The Blacklist, and A Way Out trailer.
- Their song "Footsteps" can be heard in season 6, episode 3 ("The Pharmacist") of The Blacklist.
- Their cover version of the Sam Cooke song "You Send Me" was featured in Vampire Diaries and advertising for Victoria's Secret.
- Their song "Somehow" was featured on Supernatural.
- The song "Connected" was featured in Grey's Anatomy, Suits, Mistresses, a Friskies commercial and a BlackPeopleMeet commercial.
- "Time Go" was featured in Suits.
- The song "Sleeping At Night" has been featured in Suits and Rake (promo).
- Their covers for "Like A Virgin" and "Portions For Foxes" have both been featured in Grey’s Anatomy.
- The song "Like No One" was featured in The Originals.
- Two of their songs are part of the Dear White People soundtrack: "Can't Let Go" and "Sleeping At Night (Dear White People Remix)".
- The Amazon Prime original series Bosch uses the band's song "Can't Let Go" as its theme song.
- The song "Hold Out" was featured in the movie Good Kill.

== Albums ==
- 2014: Human Nature; Label: +1 Records
