= Muppets Haunted Mansion =

2021 puppet comedy Halloween special

- Official release poster
- Directed by: Kirk Thatcher
- Screenplay by: Bill Barretta; Kirk Thatcher; Kelly Younger
- Story by: Bill Barretta; Kirk Thatcher; Kelly Younger; Jim Lewis
- Based on: The Haunted Mansion by Walt Disney; Characters by Jim Henson
- Produced by: Chelsea DeVincent; Michael Steinbach
- Starring: Dave Goelz; Bill Barretta; Eric Jacobson; Matt Vogel; Peter Linz; David Rudman; Alice Dinnean; Bruce Lanoil; Julianne Buescher; Brian Henson
- Cinematography: Craig Kief
- Edited by: Alexandra Amick; Jason Bierfeld
- Music by: Ed Mitchell; Steve Morrell
- Production companies: Disney Branded Television; The Muppets Studio; Soapbox Films
- Distributed by: Disney+
- Release date: October 8, 2021
- Running time: 50 minutes
- Country: United States
- Language: English

Muppets Haunted Mansion is a 2021 American comedy Halloween special based on the Disney properties The Muppets and The Haunted Mansion. It was released on Disney+ on October 8, 2021. The plot stars Gonzo and Pepe as they face the challenge of staying in a haunted mansion for one night. It is the Muppets' first Halloween special and received generally positive reviews from critics.

== Plot ==
Instead of attending the Muppets' annual Halloween party, Gonzo and Pepe are on their way to a fear challenge event in the same haunted mansion where Gonzo's favorite magician, The Great MacGuffin, disappeared one-hundred years ago. Upon being dropped off by their hearse driver, Gonzo and Pepe meet the Caretaker, along with several ghosts and singing busts.

Their "Ghost Host" tells Gonzo that he has been summoned to the mansion to see if he can survive one night. If he cannot, he and Pepe will be trapped there forever. While Gonzo claims that he fears nothing, Pepe is easily scared by everything he sees in the mansion. After meeting Madame Pigota (who resembles Miss Piggy), Gonzo and Pepe come across a room full of several ghosts resembling various Muppets. The Host soon appears and informs Gonzo that in order to survive the mansion he must face his fears in Room 999.

As Gonzo is led to the room, Pepe meets and becomes entranced by the ghost of Constance Hatchaway, who plans to marry and then kill him as he meets the ghosts of her past husbands. Gonzo is trapped in Room 999 (with the room's number sign turning upside down to read "666") and starts to turn old as his reflection taunts him. Recalling a conversation with Kermit he had earlier, Gonzo realizes he is indeed afraid of something: that no one will like him if he does not do dangerous stunts. He then remembers the Host's advice of facing his fears being the key to escaping the room after fearing he will be trapped in the mansion forever. Gonzo ultimately realizes he is afraid of never seeing his friends again and the room de-ages and releases him.

The Host congratulates Gonzo for facing his fears and tells him that he is free to go so long as he makes it out by sunrise. After realizing that Pepe is in trouble, Gonzo refuses to leave without him. With the help of the Host's candelabra, Gonzo is able to find Pepe and stop the wedding. The pair jump out the window and make it out of the mansion just as the sun rises.

The Host meets them at the gate, revealing himself to be the Great MacGuffin, who is impressed that Gonzo was willing to do what he could not; face his fears. The hearse driver picks them up and Kermit video calls asking the pair to meet him and the other Muppets for breakfast. He then comments that Gonzo and Pepe should bring their friends along, leading the two to turn and see the Hitchhiking Ghosts behind them.

== Cast ==
- Will Arnett as the Host/The Great MacGuffin
- Yvette Nicole Brown as the Hearse Driver
- Darren Criss as the Caretaker
- Taraji P. Henson as the Bride
- Kim Irvine as Haunted Mansion Maid
- Quinn McPherson as Hallway Knight
- John Stamos as Famous Person

=== Ghosts ===
- Ed Asner as Claude
- Jeannie Mai as Maude
- Chrissy Metz as Harriet
- Alfonso Ribeiro as Fred
- Danny Trejo as Huet
- Sasheer Zamata as Mary

=== Singing Busts ===
- Skai Jackson
- Geoff Keighley
- Justina Machado
- Craig Robinson
- Pat Sajak

=== Muppet performers ===
- Dave Goelz as:
  - The Great Gonzo
  - Dr. Bunsen Honeydew as a Staring Bust
  - Waldorf as a Happy Haunt
  - Beauregard as George Hightower
  - Randy Pig as a Happy Haunt
  - Chip as himself and Pickwick the Chandelier Ghost
  - Zoot as a member of Madame Pigota's ghost band
- Bill Barretta as:
  - Pepe the King Prawn
  - Rowlf the Dog as the Organist
  - Dr. Teeth as a member of Madame Pigota's ghost band
  - Johnny Fiama as Frank Banks
  - Howard Tubman as a Happy Haunt
  - Bobo the Bear as a Happy Haunt
  - Big Mean Carl as a Happy Haunt
  - Swedish Chef as a Happy Haunt
  - Andy Pig as a Happy Haunt
  - Bubba the Rat as a Happy Haunt
  - Beautiful Day Monster as himself and as a Happy Haunt
  - Clean Gene the Behemoth as himself and as a Happy Haunt
  - Party Tomato
- Eric Jacobson as:
  - Miss Piggy as herself and Madame Pigota
  - Fozzie Bear as himself and Gauzey the Hatbox Bear
  - Sam Eagle as a Duelist
  - Animal as a member of Madame Pigota's ghost band
- Matt Vogel as:
  - Kermit the Frog as himself and the Mansion Show host
  - Floyd Pepper as a member of Madame Pigota's ghost band
  - Pops as a Duelist
  - Crazy Harry as a Happy Haunt
  - Lew Zealand as Reginald Caine
  - Uncle Deadly as the Justice of the Peace
  - Sweetums as a Ghost Servant
- Peter Linz as:
  - Walter as Ambrose Harper
  - Robin the Frog as the Birthday Ghost
  - Statler as a Happy Haunt
  - Joe the Legal Weasel as a Happy Haunt
  - Lips as a member of Madame Pigota's band
  - The ghosts
- David Rudman as:
  - Scooter as himself and as a Happy Haunt
  - Janice as a member of Madame Pigota's band
  - Beaker as a Staring Bust
  - Wayne as a Happy Haunt
  - Squid Ghost
- Brian Henson as:
  - Sal Minella as Frank Banks's sidekick
- Julianne Buescher as:
  - Yolanda Rat as a Happy Haunt
  - Beverly Plume as a Happy Haunt
  - Wanda as a Happy Haunt
  - Screaming Goat
- Alice Dinnean as:
  - Miss Cartier as a Happy Haunt
  - Mummy
  - Caretaker's Dog
  - Pee Wee
- Bruce Lanoil as:
  - Duddy
  - Ballroom Rat
  - Mo Frackle as a Happy Haunt (uncredited)
- Nicolette Santino as:
  - Party Tomato
- Alex Villa as:
  - Pumpkin

== Production ==
Early attempts to produce a Halloween special centered on The Muppets date back to the early 1990s. Following Jim Henson's death, his son Brian planned to continue the franchise's presence on television by releasing a series of holiday specials, with the first one tentatively centered around Halloween. The project was ultimately cancelled, and eventually the television series Muppets Tonight (1996–1998) and the 2000 video game Muppet Monster Adventure were released instead.

In March 2009, it was announced during a special event at Disney's Hollywood Studios, that the Walt Disney Company, who acquired The Muppets in 2004, was developing a Halloween special based on the franchise. A 2010 release date was later announced. However, the special was postponed in order for the Muppets Studio to focus entirely on the 2011 film, and eventually cancelled.

In May 2021, a Muppets Halloween special based on the Disney theme park attraction The Haunted Mansion, titled Muppets Haunted Mansion, was announced to be in development. Filming took place in April 2021 during eighteen days. In August 2021, longtime Muppet director Kirk Thatcher revealed that he wrote and directed the special, and shared a teaser image from it.

Later that month, Geoff Keighley and Darren Criss were revealed to be part of the cast as Uncle Theodore and The Caretaker, respectively, while Kelly Younger was revealed as co-writer. The rest of the cast was announced the following September.

Ed Mitchell and Steve Morrell wrote the music for the special, including three new songs, titled "Rest In Peace", "Life Hereafter", and "Tie The Knot Tango", as well as a cover of King Harvest's "Dancing in the Moonlight".

This was one of Ed Asner's final acting works before his death, he was described on The Muppets social media as "a great friend of the Muppets" at the time of his death and the special was dedicated to his memory.

== Release ==
Muppets Haunted Mansion was released exclusively on Disney+ on October 8, 2021. The special made its linear TV premiere on Disney Channel on October 22, 2022.

== Reception ==
=== Audience viewership ===
According to Whip Media, Muppets Haunted Mansion was the 6th most streamed movie across all platforms in the United States during the week of October 10, 2021, and the 10th during the week of October 17, 2021.

=== Critical response ===
On review aggregation website Rotten Tomatoes, the film holds an approval rating of 70% based on 30 reviews, with an average rating of 6.30/10. Metacritic gave the film a weighted average score of 67 out of 100, based on 4 critics, indicating "generally favorable reviews".

John Serba of Decider praised the humor saying, "Muppets Haunted Mansion is trifling silliness. It inspires some smiles, if not out-loud laughter." W. Andrew Powell of The GATE reviewed the show positively, stating, "Disney World's Haunted Mansion meets The Muppets in one of the best, and most entertaining Muppet experiences in years." Victoria Rose Caister of GameRant.com complimented the series, stating that the "spooky elements are actually done in a very nice way", and the show is "a really solid watch that will be easy to throw on for kids or adults at Halloween time."

Garrett Martin of Paste rated the Halloween special 8 out of 10 and stated that Muppets Haunted Mansion recalls The Muppet Show, saying, "It's a silly, ultimately heartfelt hour destined to become a holiday favorite for fans of Disney parks, the Muppets, or just felt in general." Tara Bennett of IGN gave the series 8 out of 10, claiming, "The Muppets at their best are timeless, and this special captures much of that spirit." Polly Conway of Common Sense Media rated the Halloween special 4 out of 5 stars, stated the Halloween special promotes positive message and role models, such as being courageous and encouraging others, while complimenting the diverse representations across the portrayal of different origins.

=== Accolades ===
Year	Award	Category	Recipient(s)	Result	Ref.
2022	Producers Guild of America Awards	Outstanding Children's Program	Muppets Haunted Mansion	Won	
2022	Hollywood Makeup Artist and Hair Stylist Guild Awards	Best Contemporary Makeup - Television Special, One Hour or More Live Program Series, or Movie for Television	Elle Favorule, Sonia Cabrera, Michelle Sfarzo	Nominated	
2022	Children's and Family Emmy Awards	Outstanding Fiction Special	Muppets Haunted Mansion	Nominated	
2022	Children's and Family Emmy Awards	Outstanding Casting for a Live-Action Program	Tony Shepherd, Anne McGinnis	Nominated	
2022	Children's and Family Emmy Awards	Outstanding Art Direction/Set Decoration/Scenic Design	Darcy Prevost, Kathryn Molenaar, Mark D. Allen, Jeanine Ringer	Won	
2022	Children's and Family Emmy Awards	Outstanding Special Effects Costumes, Hair and Makeup	Lisa Davis, Rebecca Graves, Donna May, Sean Smith, Renee Vaca, Elle Favorule, Sonia Cabrera	Nominated	
