= Justin Simien =

American filmmaker, actor, and author (born 1983)

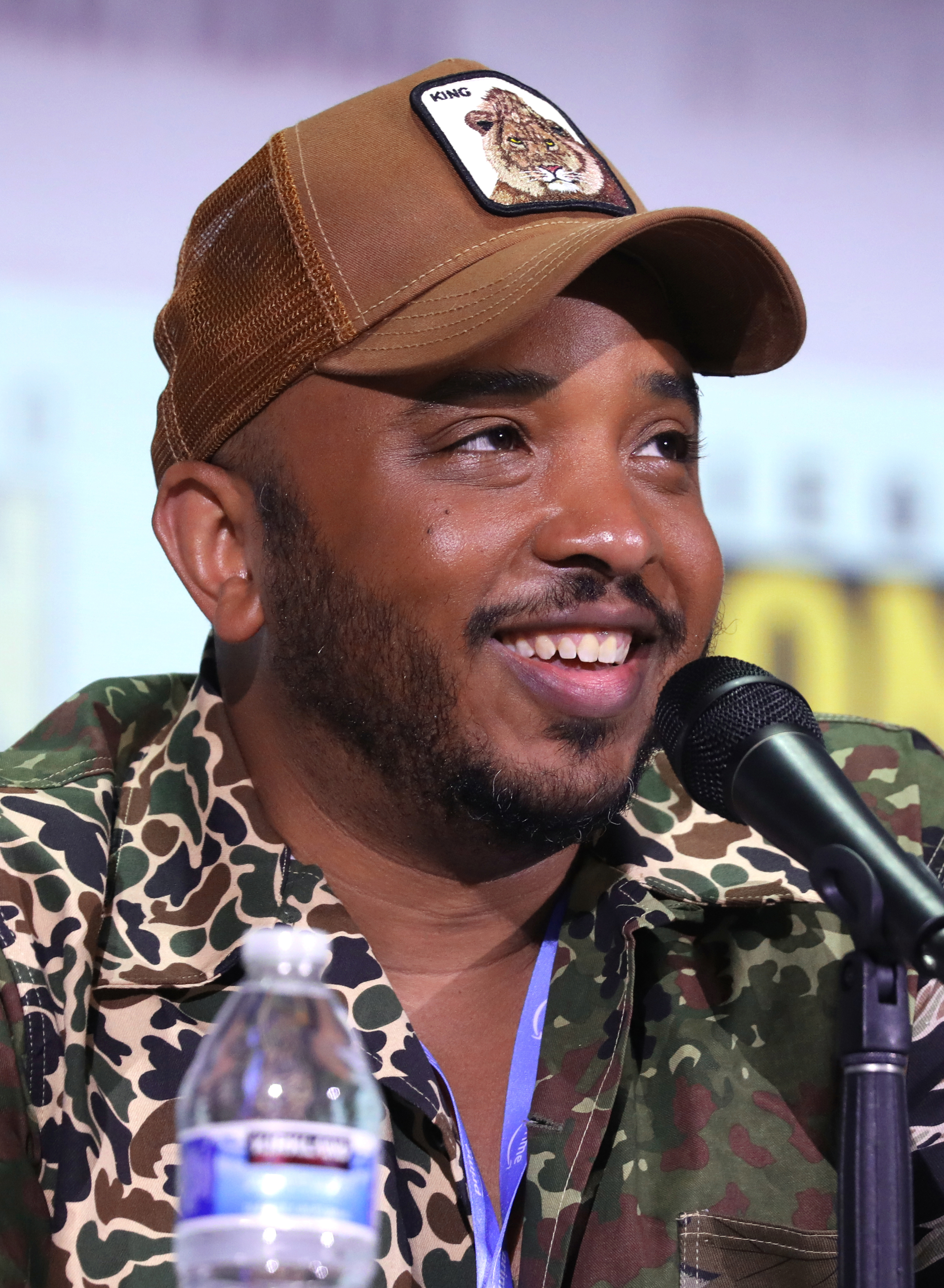
- Simien speaking at the 2023 San Diego Comic-Con
- Born: Houston, Texas, U.S.
- Education: Chapman University
- Occupations: Film director, producer, screenwriter, actor, author
- Spouse: Rick Proctor (m. 2022)
- Awards: U.S. Dramatic Special Jury Award for Breakthrough Talent

Justin Simien is an American filmmaker, actor, and author. His first feature film, Dear White People, won the U.S. Dramatic Special Jury Award for Breakthrough Talent at the 2014 Sundance Film Festival. It was later adapted into the Netflix series of the same name (2017–2021). Simien has also been named to Variety's 2013 "10 Directors to Watch" list.

== Early life ==
Simien was born in Houston, Texas. He was raised Catholic and his father died while Justin was young. Raised in the metro area, he attended the Kinder High School for the Performing and Visual Arts. After graduation he studied film at Chapman University in California. Simien worked a number of jobs in Los Angeles prior to directing his first feature film, including social media manager at Sony Television, publicity assistant at Focus Features, and publicity coordinator at Paramount Pictures.

== Career ==
Simien directed three short films prior to Dear White People: Rings (2006), My Women: Inst Msgs (2009), and INST MSGS (Instant Messages) (2009).

Simien started work on what would become Dear White People in 2006, with inspiration for the script coming from his feelings while attending the predominantly white Chapman University. In 2012, he created a concept trailer using his tax refund as funding. With the concept trailer as a centerpiece, he launched a crowdfunding campaign on Indiegogo to raise $25,000 but he got an overwhelming response and managed to raise $40,000 instead.

The film premiered in-competition in the US Dramatic Category at 2014 Sundance Film Festival on January 18, 2014. The film began its theatrical release in the United States on October 17, 2014. In its opening weekend the film grossed $344,000 in only eleven locations for a $31,273 per theatre average.

Dear White People won Simien the U.S. Dramatic Special Jury Award for Breakthrough Talent at the 2014 Sundance Film Festival and the "Audience Award" at the 2014 San Francisco International Film Festival. Simien has also been named to Variety's 2013 "10 Directors to Watch" list.

On May 5, 2016, Lionsgate announced a deal to produce a Dear White People television series based on the film and distributed through Netflix with the show's first ten episodes to be written by Simien. The series was released in April 2017 to critical acclaim. Peter Debruge, writing for Variety, praised the writing, directing, social commentary, and cast. The New York Times praised the series' examination of concerns such as appropriation, assimilation, and conflict. In June 2017 the series was renewed for a second season, which was released in May 2018. On June 21, 2018, the series was renewed for a third season, which was released in August 2019. On October 2, 2019, the series was renewed for its fourth and final season, which was released in September 2021.

He was the writer, director, and songwriter for the 2020 horror comedy Bad Hair. It had its world premiere at the 2020 Sundance Film Festival. Shortly after, Hulu acquired distribution rights to the film. It was released in a limited release on October 16, 2020, by Neon, followed by digital streaming on Hulu on October 23, 2020. The film received mixed reviews from critics.

In 2019, Simien launched his production company, Culture Machine.

At Disney Investor Day 2020, he was announced as the showrunner for a new Disney+ series about Lando Calrissian, called Lando.

In April 2021, Simien signed on to direct a new film adaptation of the Disney theme park attraction The Haunted Mansion. Haunted Mansion was released on July 28, 2023, to mostly negative reviews from critics and was a box office bomb. More recently, Simien signed an overall deal with Paramount Television Studios, under which he began adapting Geoff Johns's comic Geiger for television.

In July 2023, Simien revealed he had not been given any updates on Lando since 2020. Later that month, it was reported that Simien had departed Lando due to commitments to Haunted Mansion. Donald Glover and his brother Stephen were revealed as his replacements. Earlier the same day, however, an interview was published between Simien and The Hollywood Reporter, where Simien said "I am attached, I think, but I don't really know" when asked if he was still writing Lando. He knew it was very possible he had been quietly fired, saying "Am I too Black? Am I too queer? And people just don't want to say that?"

=== Influences ===
While Simien has been compared to director Spike Lee, Simien says he does not welcome this comparison because he does not want to be "the next Spike Lee" but instead "the next Justin Simien" (although he does credit Lee's Do the Right Thing with "showing him that it's possible to make these types of black films"). Simien also counts Woody Allen and Ingmar Bergman among his influences.

== Personal life ==
At the 2014 Sundance Film Festival premiere of Dear White People, Simien publicly announced he is gay.

On Celebrity Family Feud season 9, episode 3, portrait photographer/comedian Rick Proctor was identified as Simien's husband.

== Filmography ==
=== Feature films ===
Year	Film	Director	Writer	Producer	Notes
2014	Dear White People	Yes	Yes	Yes	Directorial debut
2020	Bad Hair	Yes	Yes	Yes	Also role "Reggie 'MC McCree' Watson"; Also songwriter
2023	Haunted Mansion	Yes	Additional literary material	No	

=== Short films ===
Year	Film	Director	Writer	Producer	Editor	Other	Notes
2006	I'll Meet You in Your Womb	No	No	No	No	Yes	Unit production manager
2006	Rings	Yes	Yes	Executive	Yes	No	
2009	My Women: Inst Msgs	Yes	Yes	No	Yes	No	
2009	INST MSGS (Instant Messages)	Yes	Yes	Co-Producer	Yes	Yes	Role: Cameo
2010	Head	No	No	Yes	No	No	
2011	Save Me	No	No	No	Yes	Yes	Gaffer
2013	The Goldfish	No	No	No	Yes	No	
2014	Get Your Life	Yes	No	No	No	No	Music video for Caught a Ghost
2015	I Can't With You	No	No	No	No	Yes	Role: Marshall

=== Television ===
Year	Show	Director	Writer	Executive producer	Creator	Notes
2017–2021	Dear White People	Yes	Yes	Yes	Yes	Creator and executive producer (40 episodes); Director (15 episodes); Writer (10 episodes); Role as "Jerry Skyler" in episode "Volume 3: Chapter 7"
2023	Ladies First: A Story of Women in Hip-Hop	No	No	Yes	No	Documentary mini-series (4 episodes)
2024	Hollywood Black	Yes	No	Yes	No	Documentary mini-series (4 episodes)
TBA	Flashdance	Yes	Yes	No	No	Future series
TBA	Geiger	No	No	Yes	No	Future series
TBA	Plan A	No	Yes	Yes	Yes	Co-created with Steven J. Kung & Leann Bowen
TBA	Untitled Star Trek comedy series	No	Yes	Yes	Yes	Co-created with Tawny Newsome & Alex Kurtzman
