= Concourse (disambiguation) =

A concourse is a place where pathways or roads meet.

Concourse may also refer to:

- Concourse, Bronx - a neighborhood in the West Bronx.
- Concourse (newspaper), the student newspaper at Keele University
- Concourse Program at MIT
- Concourse at Landmark Center, in Atlanta
- The Concourse, in Singapore
- The Concourse, Chatswood

== See also ==
- Winter Street Concourse, in Boston
- Music Concourse, in San Francisco
- Concourse on High, Bahá'í concept
- Grand Concourse (disambiguation)
- Concours (disambiguation)
