= Concourse =

Place where pathways or roads meet

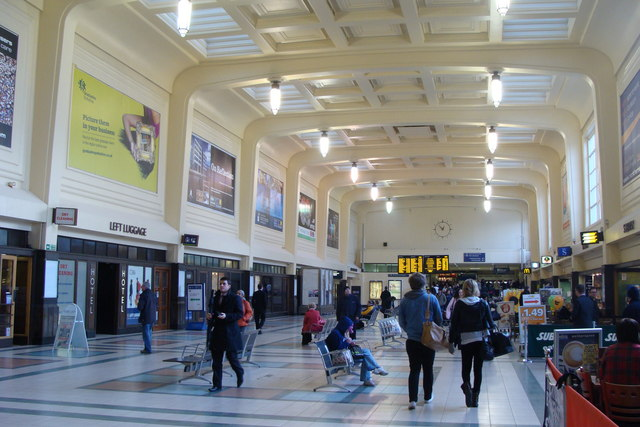
Leeds railway station (2009), a public transport concourse.

A concourse is a place where pathways or roads meet, such as in a hotel, a convention center, a railway station, an airport terminal, a hall, or other space.

The term is not limited to places where there are literally pathways or roadways or train tracks joining. An alternate meaning now is "an open space or hall (as in a railway terminal) where crowds gather." In this meaning as a place where crowds gather, while many persons in any crowd no doubt have followed different paths in their lives to get to the place, there need not be notable specific roadways leading to the place.

== Examples ==
Examples of concourses include:

- Airport terminals
- Conference centres
- Hotels
- Meeting halls
- Railway stations
- Shopping malls or portions of shopping malls which are often called "shopping concourses"
- Sports arenas and stadiums
- Universities

== Gallery ==
=== Outdoor concourses ===
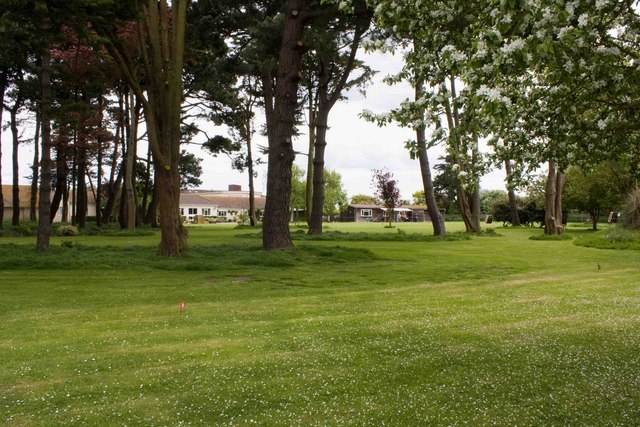
Earnley Concourse, West Sussex, 2009 (Note: This local village name for its common land may imply an early usage of the word, concourse.)

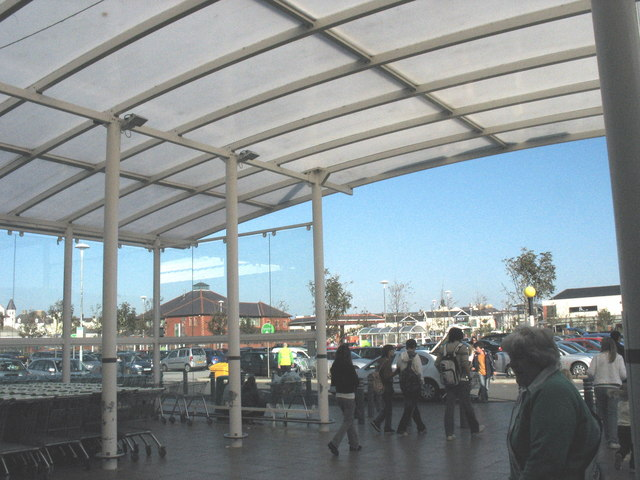
Asda supermarket concourse, Llandudno, 2007

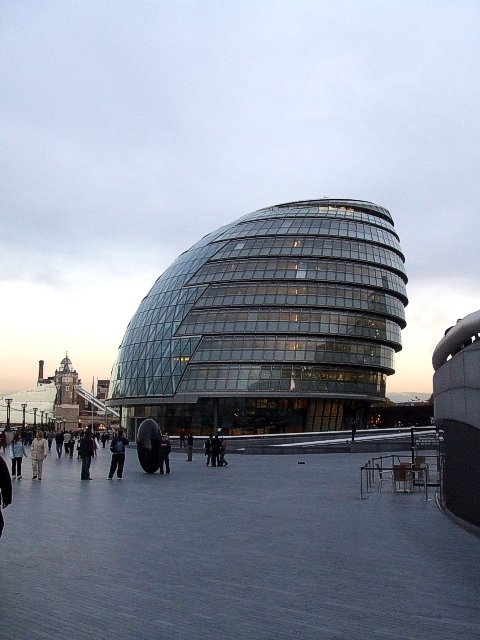
Concourse outside City Hall, London.

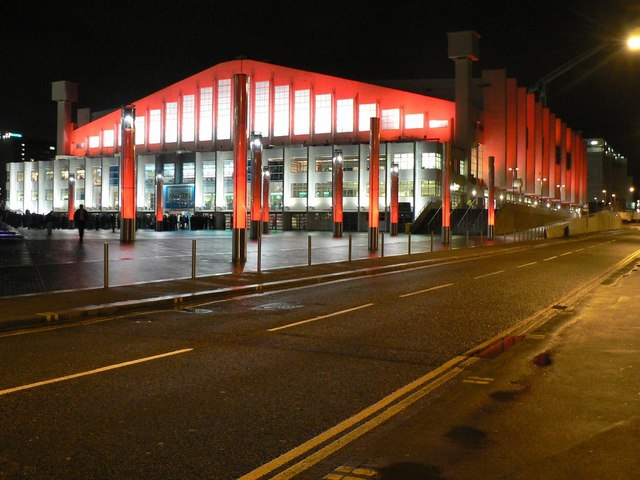
Concourse outside Wembley Arena, 2008

=== Public transport concourses ===
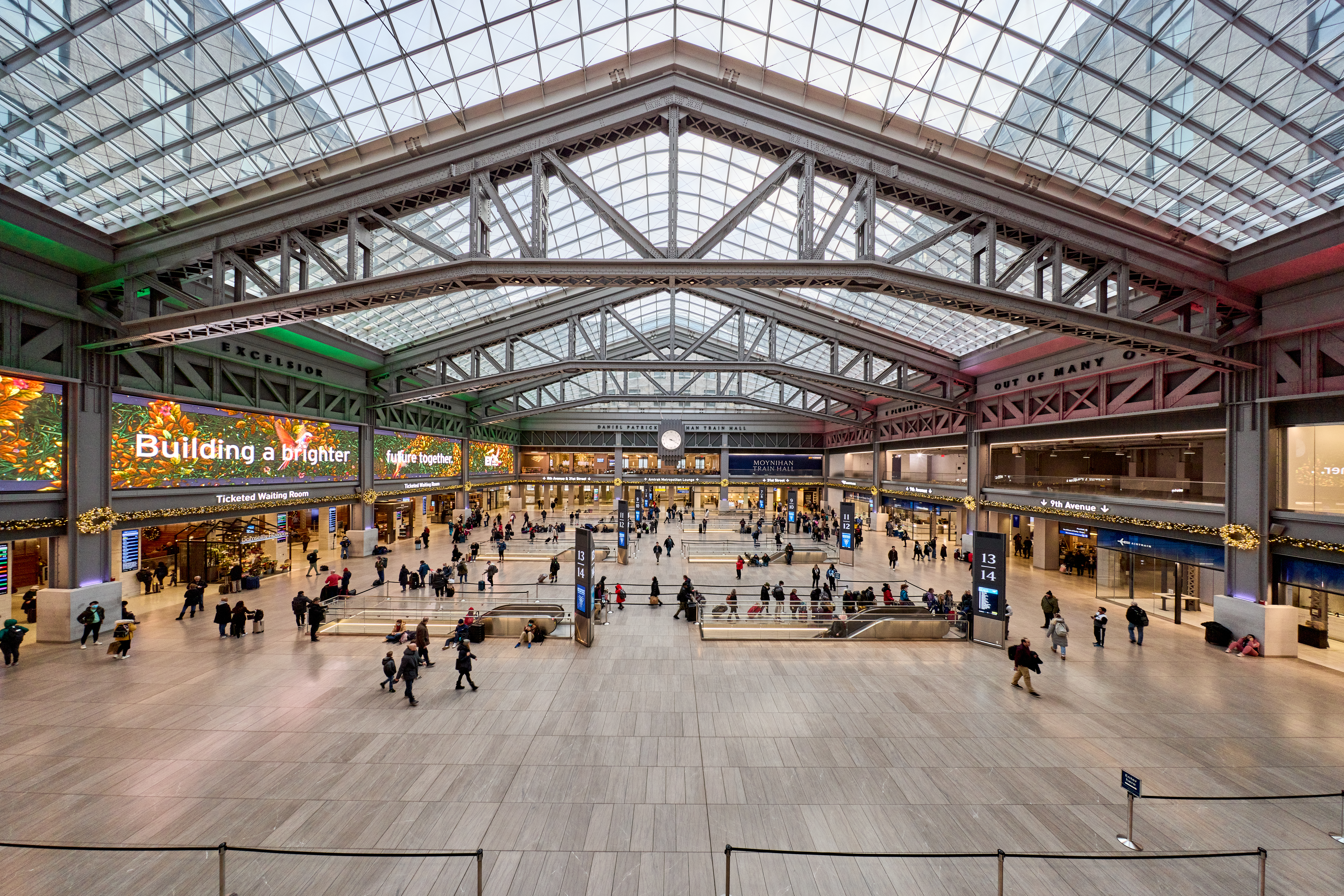
The interior of the Moynihan Train Hall at Pennsylvania Station in New York City, 2022

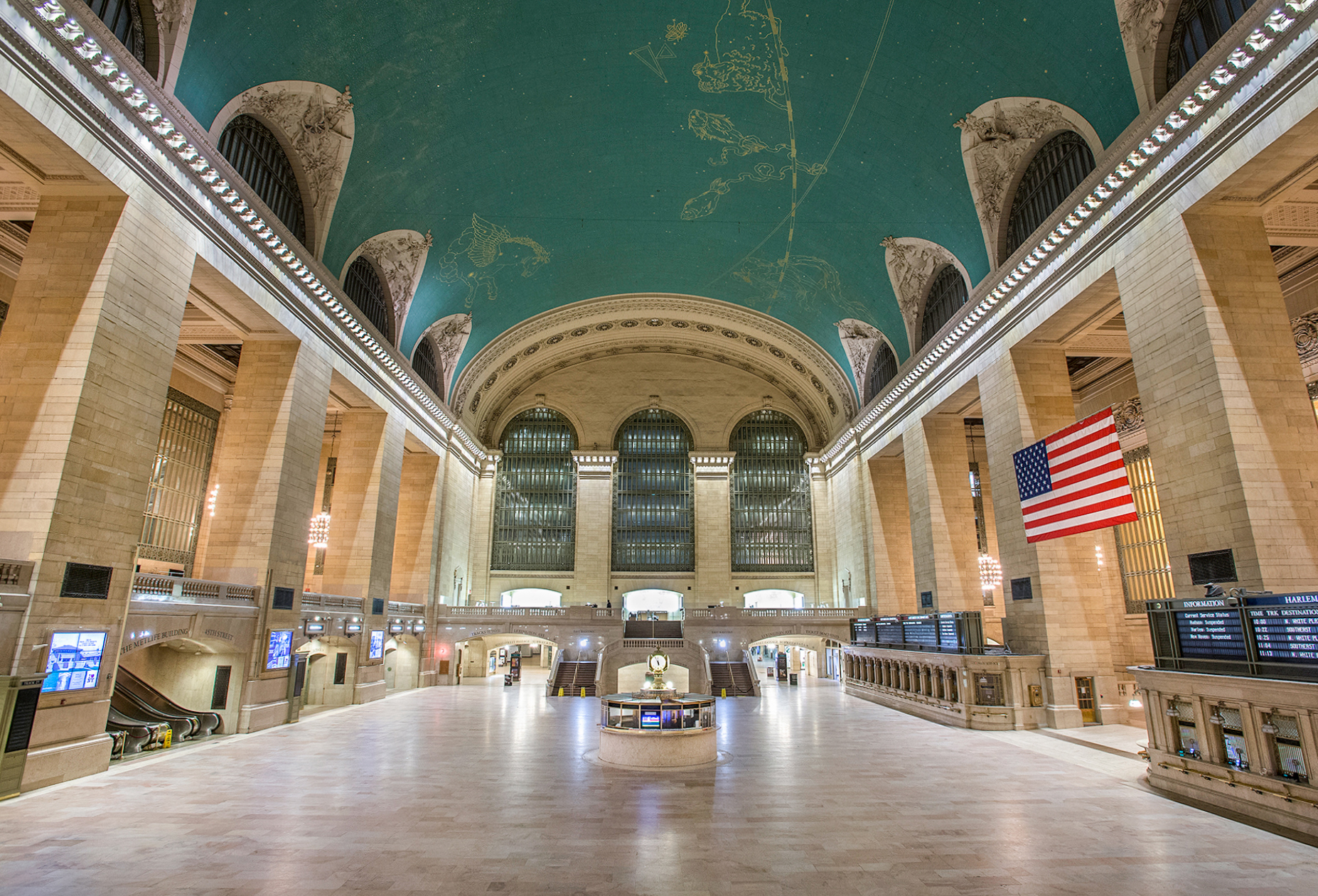
Grand Central Terminal's Main Concourse, Manhattan, 2015

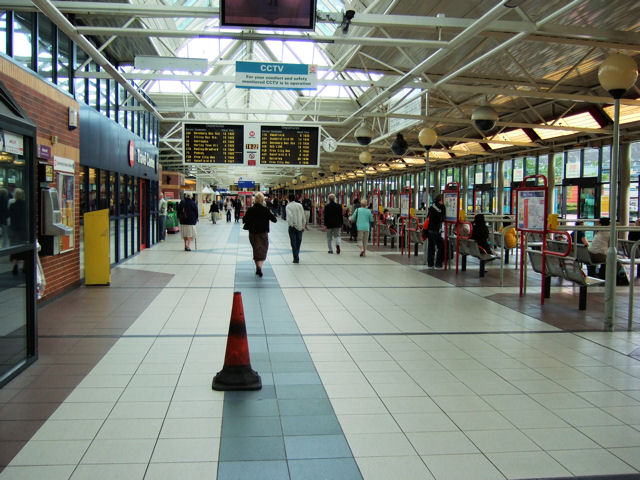
Leeds City bus station concourse, 2007

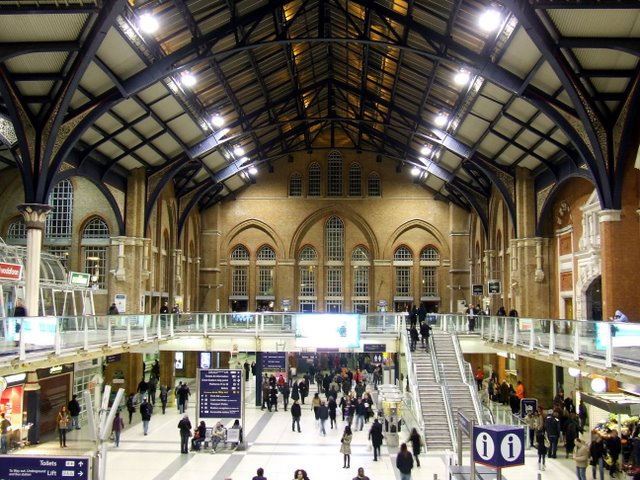
Liverpool Street concourse, 2009

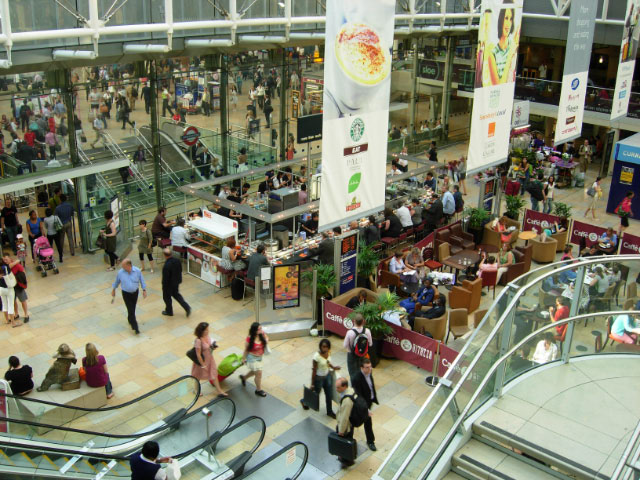
London Paddington station concourse, The Lawn, 2009

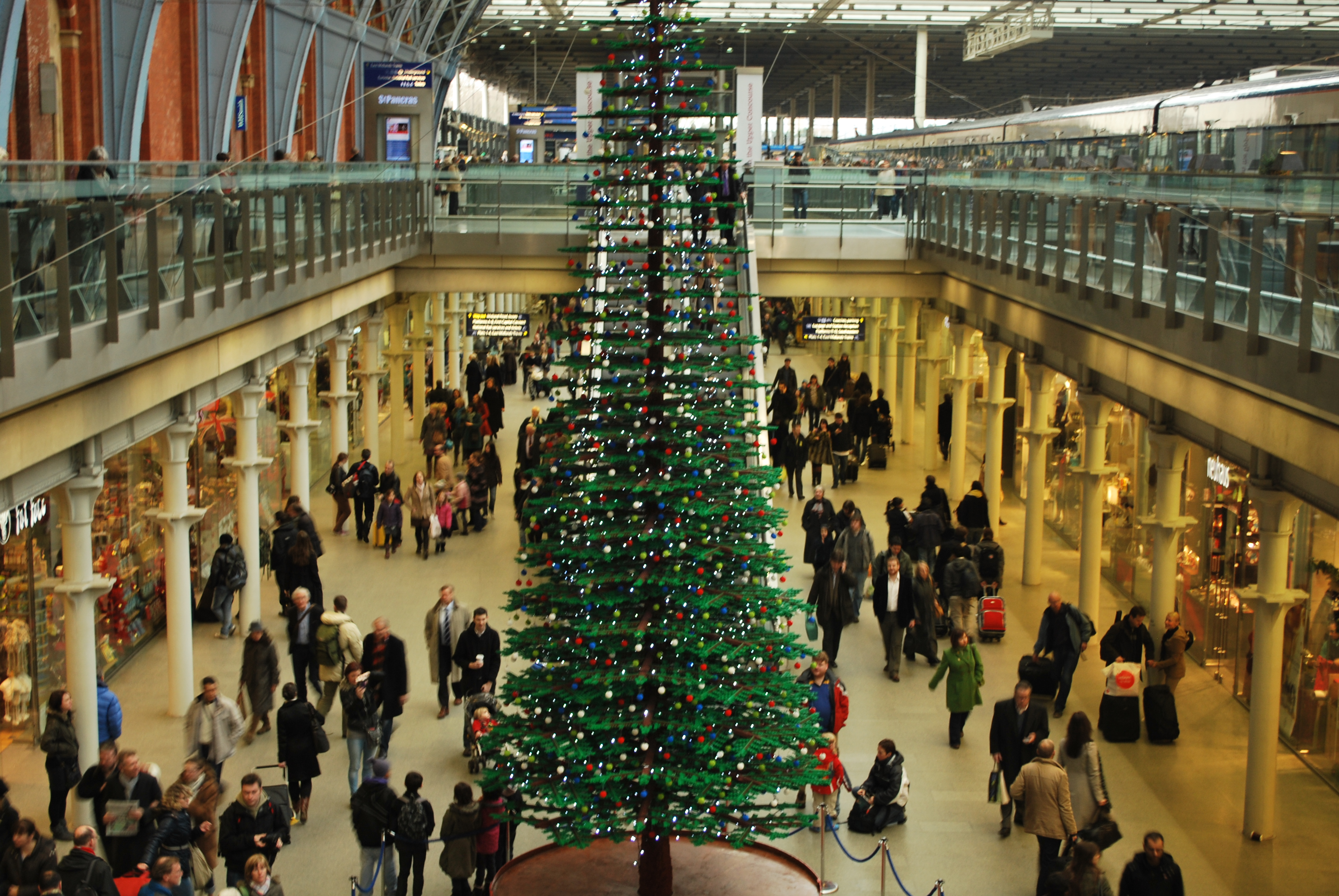
St Pancras shopping concourse during Christmas, 2011

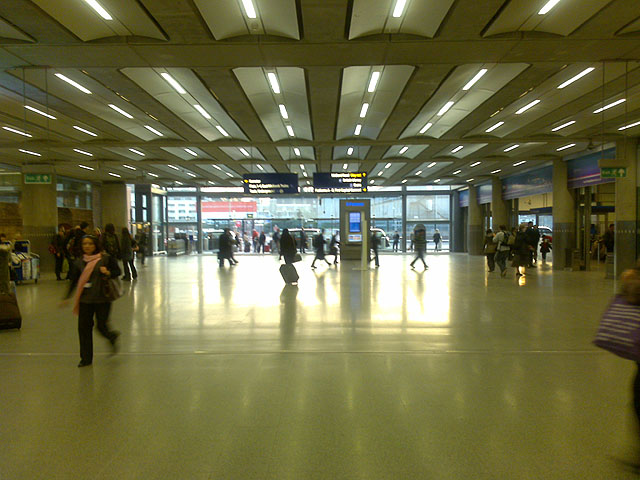
St Pancras entrance concourse, 2009

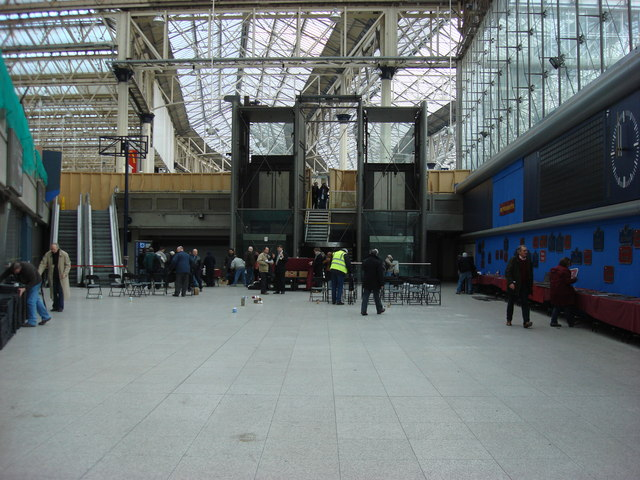
Waterloo Station former Eurostar check-in concourse, 2009

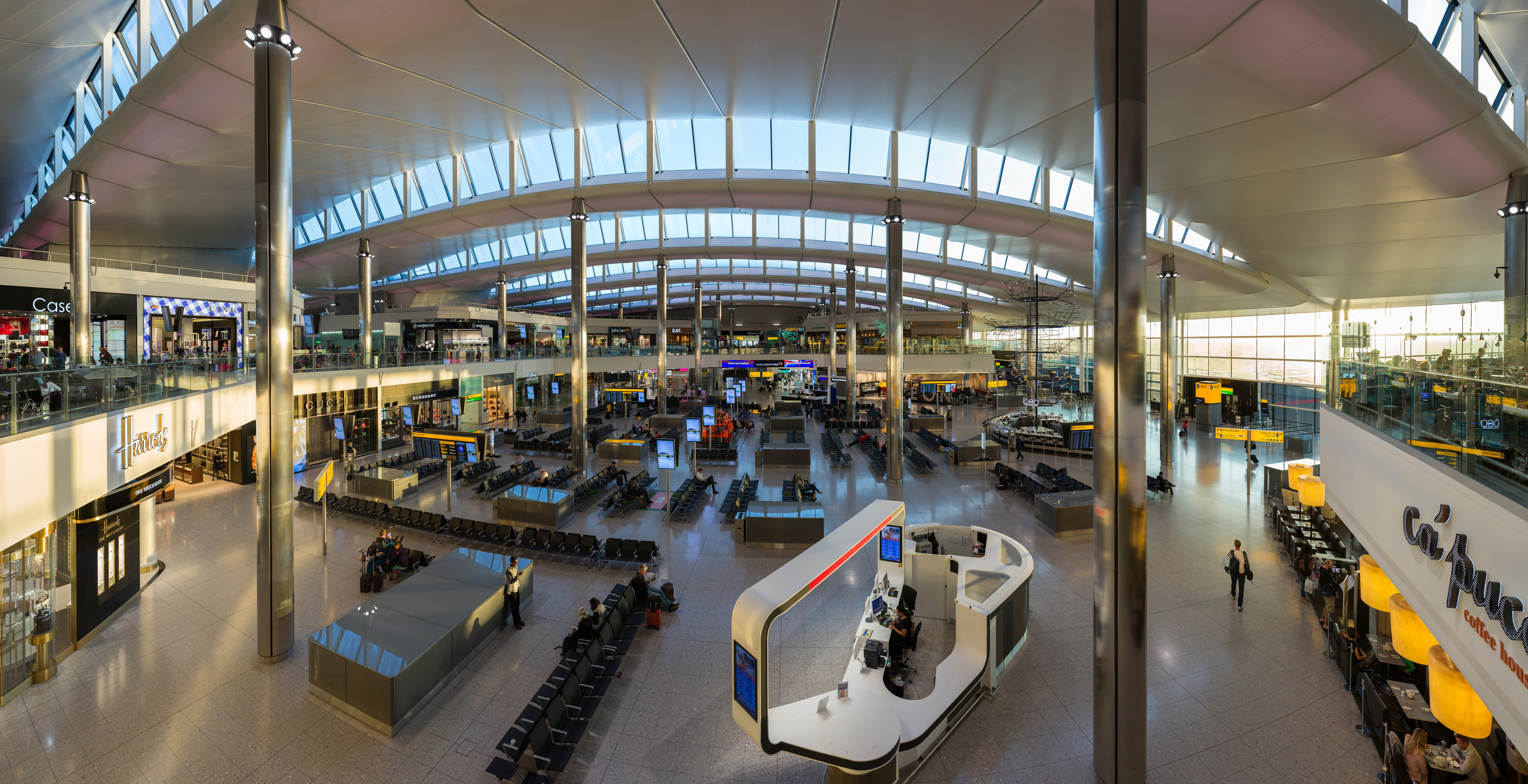
Terminal 2 departures area of London Heathrow Airport

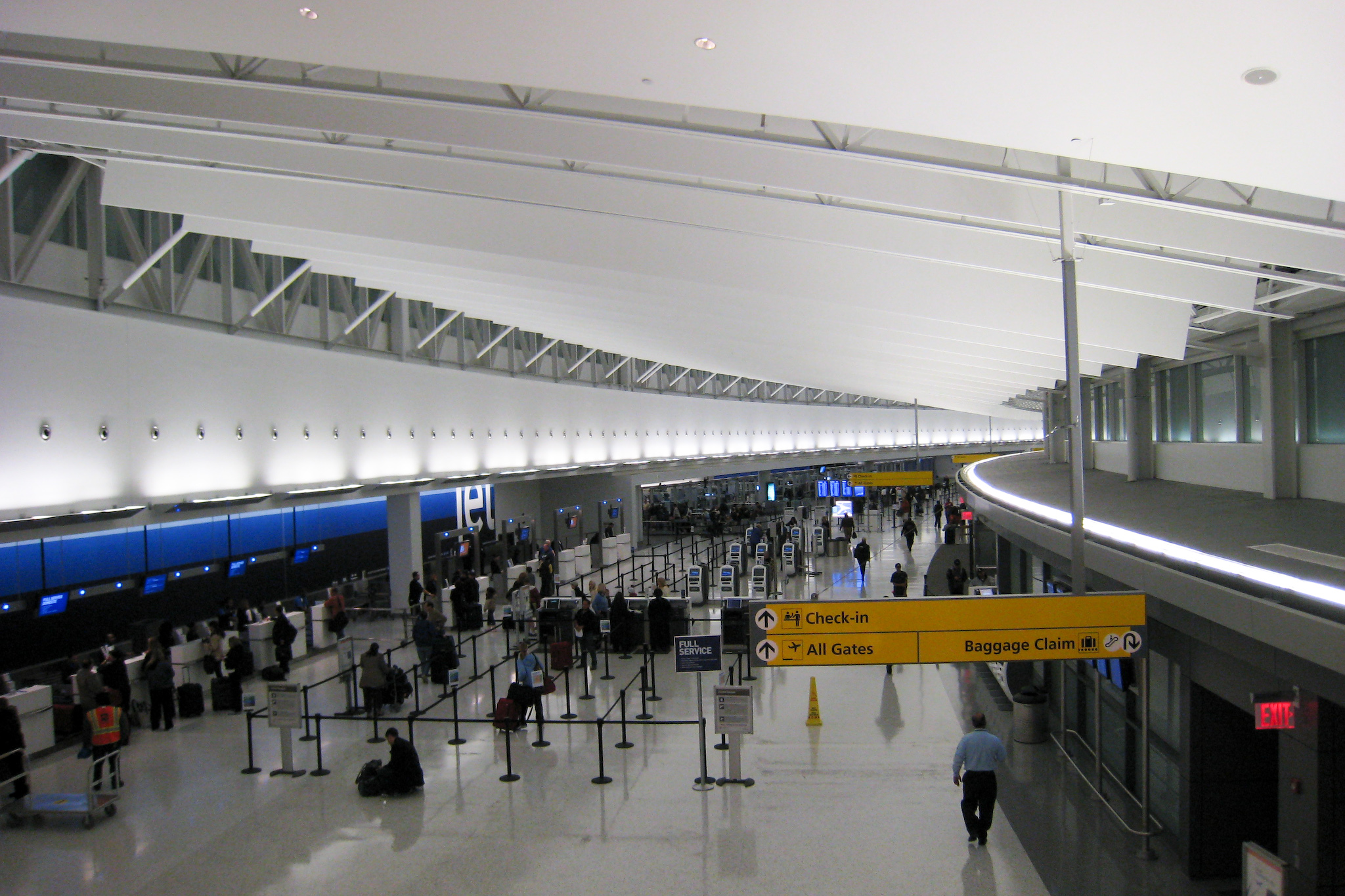
Terminal 5 of the John F. Kennedy International Airport in New York City

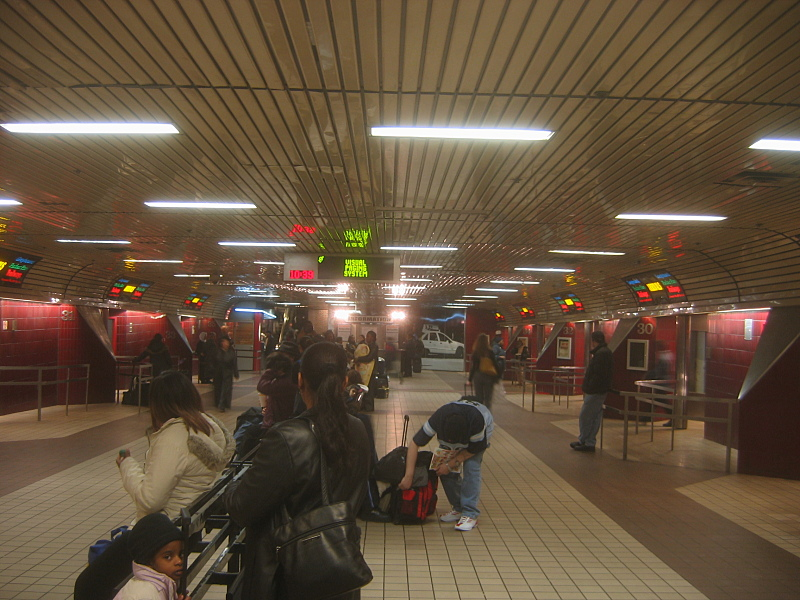
Gates 1-85 on the lower level of the Port Authority Bus Terminal in New York City

=== Car park concourses ===
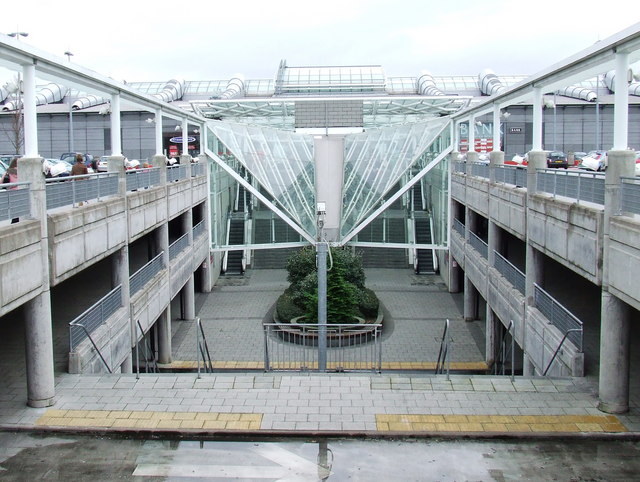
Braehead car park concourse in Scotland, 2008

== Contemporary usage ==
More recently, "concourse" is often used to refer to a situation where people come together in online presence, even if they do not physically come together in reality. An example of such an online community is the IEEE Student Concourse, as well as various online shopping concourses.

== See also ==
- Concourse at Landmark Center
- Concourse Program at MIT
- Concourse on High (Bahá'í Faith)
- Grand Concourse (Bronx)
