= Park Towers =

Park Towers may refer to:

- Emirates Park Towers, a hotel complex in Dubai, UAE
- Park Towers (Sandy Springs), a residential complex in Sandy Springs, Georgia, USA
- Park Towers (Houston), an office complex in Houston, Texas
- Park Towers (Tijuana), a luxury complex in Tijuana, Baja California
- Park Towers (Las Vegas), high-rise condominium towers in Paradise, Nevada
- Park Towers (South Melbourne), a public housing high-rise tower in South Melbourne, Australia

== See also ==
- Park Tower (disambiguation)
