= Concours =

Concours may refer to:

- Concours d'Elegance, a competition among car owners on the appearance of their cars
- European Civil Service Concours, a selection process for staff of the EU institutions
- A competitive examination
- Cadillac Concours, an automobile model
- Kawasaki Concours, a 1,000 cc sport touring motorcycle made by Kawasaki Motors
- Kawasaki 1400GTR, also known as the Concours 14, a 1,400 cc successor to the Concours

== See also ==
- Concourse (disambiguation)
