= Brandon Hall School =

Location
- 1701 Brandon Hall Drive; Sandy Springs, Georgia; United States

Information
- Type: Independent, coeducational, college-preparatory, boarding, day, nonsectarian
- Motto: "Find Your Path. Lead The Way."
- Established: 1959
- Closed: 2023
- President: Dean J. Fusto
- Campus: Suburban
- Colors: Navy blue and gold
- Mascot: Panther
- Website: www.brandonhall.org

Brandon Hall School was the only independent, coeducational, college preparatory day and boarding school serving grades 6–12 in Sandy Springs, Georgia, United States, in Metro Atlanta. Located within a forested area along the Chattahoochee River, the school offered a broad range of athletic and arts-oriented opportunities and a variety of multi-cultural and travel experiences. The school had approximately 140 students. Annual high school tuition for day students was $30,250, while residence students were listed at $59,150. Scholarships and aid were available.

== History ==
Founded in 1959 by Theodore and Shirley Hecht, Brandon Hall School was located on a pristine 27-acre campus on the Chattahoochee River. The campus was the former summer estate of prominent Atlantan Morris Brandon and his wife, Harriet Inman, and includes the original 1920s residence. Under Mr. Hecht's guidance, 1959 – 1980, Brandon Hall School provided one-to-one instruction to boys from across the country.

From 1980 to the present, the school had undergone many changes and improvements under the various Heads of School. During this time, the academic buildings and dormitory were built, and the school joined the Atlanta Athletic Conference while introducing a variety of competitive sports for both girls and boys. The Resident Housing was built for faculty and staff wishing to live on campus, and the Great Hall was renovated to create a welcoming entrance to the school.

The school received U.S. Department of Education recognition as a Blue Ribbon School for the 1984–1985 school year.

The School announced in an email to parents on May 22, 2023, that it lacked the finances to operate during the 2023–24 term. Parents who had already paid a deposit for the next school year were warned about the financial situation in an email on May 1. In September 2023, the school filed for Chapter 11 bankruptcy and is planning to sell all of its assets to pay off creditors.

A former teacher at the school, Kevin Ricks, was jailed for child sexual abuse in 2011.

== Accreditation ==
Brandon Hall School is accredited by AdvancEd Southern Association of Colleges and Schools and the Southern Association of Independent Schools. The school is also a member of the Atlanta Area Association of Independent Schools, the National Association of Independent Schools, Small Boarding Schools Association, and the Association of Boarding Schools.

== Academics ==
Students experience a college preparatory curriculum that focuses on STEAM fields of study (science, technology, engineering, arts, and mathematics), project-based learning, and innovative technologies.

== Arts ==
The Fine Arts Department at Brandon Hall School offers courses in Drawing and Painting, Mixed Media Sculpture, Printmaking, Middle School Theatre, Drama, Acting Methods and Techniques, Technical Theatre, Musical Theatre, Integrated Fine Arts, Vocal Music, and Instrumental Music.

In 2016, Brandon Hall School won a state title for a one-act play performance of "Almost, Maine".

== Athletics ==
As a member of the Georgia Independent School Association, Brandon Hall offers varsity, junior varsity, and middle school level sports, including cross country, soccer, volleyball, basketball, wrestling, baseball, golf, tennis, and track and field.

== Student life ==
The school offers extracurricular clubs and activities, sports, and community service opportunities. Students have opportunities to travel domestically and abroad, as well as take part in field days, Homecoming, prom, and ball games.

== Student travel programs ==
Students take learning-standards-based trips domestically and abroad during both the school year and summer.
