= Rusty Paul =

American politician (born 1952)

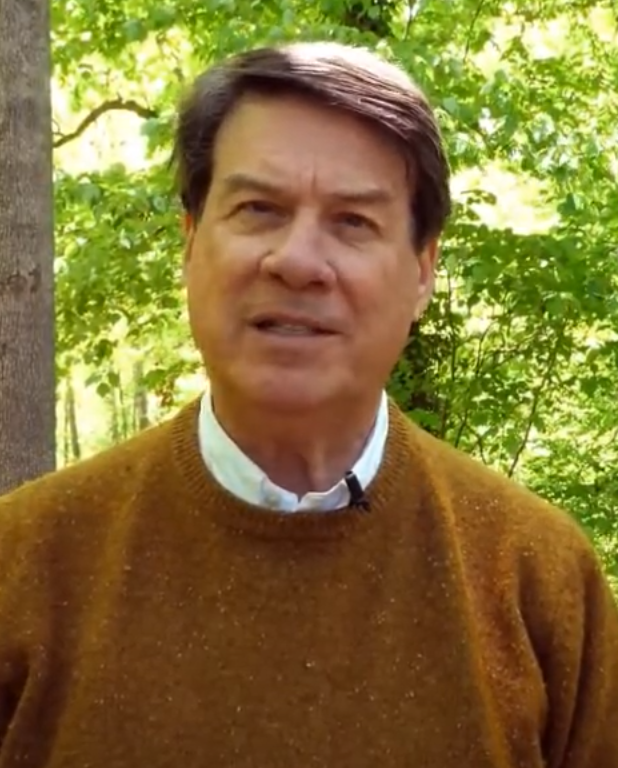
- Paul in 2021

2nd Mayor of Sandy Springs
- Incumbent
- Assumed office January 7, 2014
- Preceded by: Eva Galambos

Member of the Sandy Springs City Council
- In office January 7, 2005 – January 7, 2009
- Preceded by: Position established
- Succeeded by: Chip Collins
- Constituency: 3rd district

Member of the Georgia Senate from the 40th district
- In office January 3, 2001 – January 3, 2003
- Preceded by: Michael Egan
- Succeeded by: Liane Levetan

Chair of the Georgia Republican Party
- In office May 20, 1995 – May 15, 1999
- Preceded by: Alec Poitevint
- Succeeded by: Chuck Clay

Personal details
- Born: June 23, 1952 (age 74) Oneonta, Alabama, U.S.
- Party: Republican
- Spouse: Jan Paul (m. 1986)
- Education: Samford University (BA) (BS); Georgia State University (MA)
- Website: Office website Campaign website

Russell K. Paul (born June 23, 1952) is an American politician serving as the mayor of Sandy Springs, Georgia since 2014.

He was first elected to office December 7, 1977 as a member of the Stone Mountain city council (four terms 1978-1984).

He later joined Secretary Jack Kemp at the U.S. Department of Housing and Urban Development (1987–1991) as an intergovernmental relations office, Deputy Assistant Secretary and later as Assistant Secretary for Congressional and Intergovernmental Relations in the George H.W. Bush administration.

== Early life and education ==
Paul was born in 1952, and grew up in the Birmingham, Alabama area. He received a Bachelor’s degree at Samford University and attended graduate school at Georgia State University.

== Career ==
Paul was a Stone Mountain city council member from 1977 to 1983. From 1989 to 1993, he served as Assistant Secretary for Congressional and Intergovernmental Relations for the Housing and Urban Development Department under Secretary Jack Kemp in the George H W. Bush presidential administration. He chaired the Georgia Republican Party from 1995 to 1999, and became a State Senator representing northern Fulton County from 2001 to 2003. In 2005, he was elected to Sandy Springs city council. Paul was elected to succeed Sandy Springs' first mayor Eva Galambos in November 2013.

Paul has courted controversy for his lobbying work in relation to the Development Authority of Fulton County while serving as a publicly elected official.

== Personal life ==
Paul is married to Jan Paul and has 5 children. He is an Episcopalian.
