= Kevin Ricks =

American school teacher and criminal

Kevin Garfield Ricks
- Born: 1960 (age 65–66)
- Occupation: English teacher
- Status: In prison
- Criminal charges: Production and possession of child pornography Child sexual abuse
- Penalty: 45 years

Kevin Garfield Ricks (born 1960) is a former schoolteacher and convicted child molester and child pornography offender who targeted mostly high-school age boys from at least the late 1970s until his arrest in 2010.

== Background ==
Ricks graduated from Roanoke Rapids High School in 1978, and from UNC Chapel Hill in 1983.

== Criminal history ==
=== 1970s ===
Ricks targeted his first known victim at a summer camp for disabled children in North Carolina in 1978. This victim, a 10-year-old boy, was attending Camp Holiday Trails, at which Ricks was a counselor. It is also at this summer camps where Ricks met his wife, Abby, who would accompany him on his travels around Japan and the United States without discovering Ricks' activities with the boys he mentored.

=== 1980s ===
After graduating from college, Ricks worked at four different private schools in the southeastern United States from 1983 to 1987. The private schools at which he was employed include Brandon Hall School in Atlanta, Georgia, where Ricks served in a position that required him to live in the dormitory hall with students. In 1988, Ricks moved to Kyushu, Japan, to teach English in the town of Oguni. While living in Oguni, he was popular with the local students and routinely held gatherings with his students in his private room.

=== 1990s ===
In December 1992, Abby joined him in Aso City, Japan. One victim to come forward, Takashi Kajiwara, says that in 1994, Ricks took him to the United States for a cross country road trip. On this road trip, Kajiwara says that Ricks offered him shots of tequila and he drank until he passed out. Video tapes and photographs of Ricks undressing and molesting Kajiwara were recovered by police. Ricks and his wife left Japan in 1995 after he was accused of shoplifting and the school officials decided to let his contract lapse.

Ricks taught for one year on a temporary teaching license in North Carolina, and immediately afterwards took a job in Danville, Virginia, even though he did not have a license to teach in that state. Also during this time, Ricks entered into a foreign exchange program, Education First, and hosted young students from all over the world in his home. A Danish student who was hosted by Ricks, Uffe Emborg, says that after drinking with Ricks one night, he discovered nude photographs of himself by Ricks' bedside table. Out of fear, Emborg did not report this to the police, and instead burned the photographs with Ricks in the backyard. Ricks and his wife left Danville after Ricks was fired from Education First after being accused of stealing $2,000 from a student's bank account.

=== 2000s ===
In 2000, Ricks received a three-year teaching license for the state of Maryland and began teaching English at Colonel Richardson High School in Caroline County. While teaching at Colonel Richardson, Ricks was the head of a group called "Students Helping Other People". Parents of one group member accused him of stalking, and brought the issue to the school board, who then brought it to Child Protective Services. The school officials allowed Ricks' teaching contract to expire without renewal, referring to a licensing technicality. However, private discussions pointed to the real reason being the accusations of inappropriate behavior against Ricks.

After he stopped teaching in Caroline County, Ricks continued to host foreign exchange students, this time with American Scandinavian Student Exchange (ASSE). After a German exchange student was removed from Ricks' home during the 2003–04 school year, the student filed a restraining order against Ricks, alleging that Ricks frequently called and offered gifts. Although the restraining order was not granted, ASSE fired Ricks. Even after Ricks was terminated from ASSE he continued employment as an English teacher at Wye River Upper School in Queen Anne's County, Maryland; a school for children with "learning differences". It was there that befriended students and targeted two males freshmen. He would frequently request hugs and ask the boys to sit on his lap.

In 2006, parents of a 13-year-old boy reported that Ricks asked their son to sit on his lap and play video games, although a police investigation resulted in no charges. In the spring of 2007, Ricks was convicted of felony theft. After appealing the conviction, he left to look for a new job.

In 2007, shortly before he was again convicted and spent a weekend in jail, Ricks was hired in Manassas, Virginia. On his application, Ricks stated that he had never been arrested for or convicted of any crime.

In 2008, Ricks was tutoring a boy in Fauquier County, Virginia, and the boy's parents went to the school with a series of Myspace messages between the boy and Ricks, as well as allegations that Ricks was stalking the boy and one of his friends. A year after the accusations of stalking, the Manassas school district recommended Ricks for a full five-year teaching permit, despite his ineligibility. This recommendation was denied by the Virginia Department of Education.

The same year he was denied for his teaching license, Ricks molested one of his 16-year-old former students during winter break. He would later recount the event in his journals, referring to it as a romantic occasion.

== Arrest ==
On February 18, 2010, Ricks was arrested after reports of inappropriate Facebook messages between the boy and Ricks were received. When his home in Federalsburg, Maryland, was searched by police, dozens of handwritten journals were discovered that detailed more than three decades of Ricks' serial sexual abuse. In addition to the journals, police also recovered numerous pieces of video and photographic evidence of the abuse of many young boys by Ricks.

== Conviction ==
On March 3, 2011, Ricks pleaded guilty to seven charges of producing and possessing child pornography. The U.S. District Court of Alexandria, Virginia, sought the plea to get a long sentence for Ricks and to spare the victims from having to testify at a public trial. Over a dozen teenagers had come forward to say that Ricks had molested them. The charges, resulting in a prison sentence of 25 years, are mostly related to his offenses in Virginia and Maryland, as well as the trips to the West Coast that Ricks invited several students on.

== Additional charges ==
On January 22, 2013, Ricks was sentenced to an additional 20 years in prison for sexually abusing a student he hosted in Federalsburg, Maryland in the 2003–2004 school year.
