= Park Towers (Sandy Springs) =

High-rise apartment building in Atlanta, Georgia

Coordinates: 33.9176°N 84.3596°W

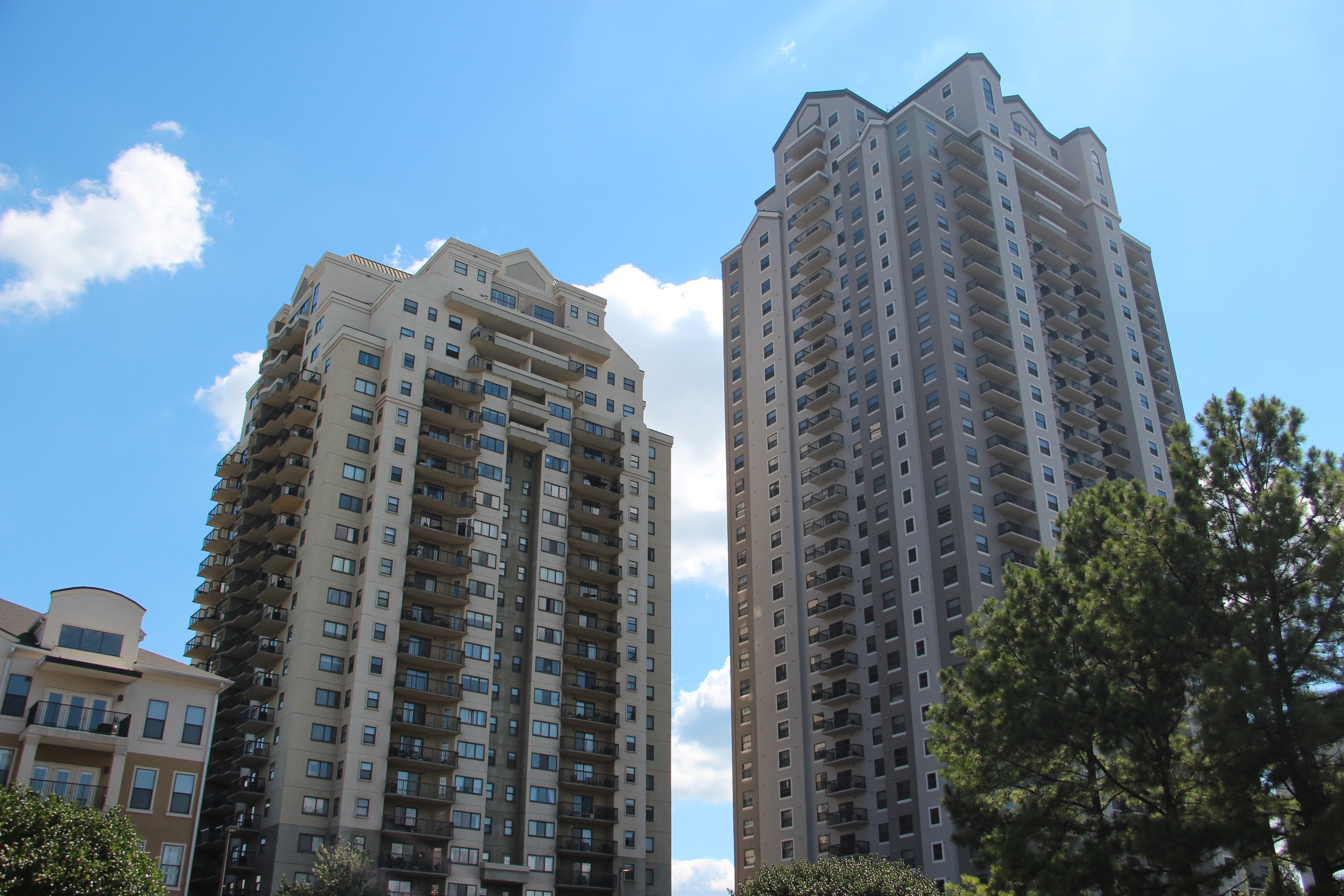
Park Towers I (center), II (right), and III (left)

Park Towers is a high-rise condominium and apartment development located in the portion of the Perimeter Center edge city which is within the U.S. city of Sandy Springs, Georgia. The development consists of three buildings: Park Towers I, Park Towers II, and Park Towers III (Park Towers Place). Buildings II and I are the third- and fourth-tallest buildings in the city (behind Concourse Corporate Center V & VI, the "King & Queen" towers), and fourth and fifth within Perimeter Center (behind Three Ravinia Drive in Dunwoody). The area is the fourth-largest business district in metro Atlanta (behind Atlanta's downtown, midtown, and Buckhead areas), and the first to reach outside the major city into the suburbs.

== Buildings ==
=== Park Towers I ===
Park Towers I is a condominium development, 24 stories high and completed in 1991. The building operated as a luxury apartment building until the developer began to sell the individual units as condominiums in 1999. In 2006, the homeowners association for Park Towers I took control from the developer. The building remains the second-tallest in the Park Towers development, and is currently the tallest condominium high-rise in the city of Sandy Springs. It is approximately 100 metres (330 ft) tall.

=== Park Towers II ===
Park Towers II is a residential tower 33 stories high, completed a few years after Park Towers I. The building is a luxury high-rise apartment community, and is the tallest apartment building in Sandy Springs. Approximately 125 metres (410 ft) tall, the building was built by, and continues to be managed by, Julian LeCraw & Company.

=== Park Towers Place ===
Park Towers Place is the advertised name for "Park Towers III". The building is a mid-rise luxury condominium project completed in 2004/2005.
