= Park Tower =

Park Tower may refer to:

- Park Tower (Chicago)
- Park Tower Condominium (Chicago)
- Park Tower (Frankfurt)
- Park Tower (Sacramento)
- Park Tower (Tampa, Florida)
- Park Tower (Washington, D.C.)
- Park Tower at Transbay (San Francisco)
- Shinjuku Park Tower (Tokyo)

== See also ==
- Park Towers (disambiguation)
