= Mercedes-Benz USA =

Distributor for Mercedes-Benz passenger cars

Mercedes-Benz USA, LLC
- Type: Subsidiary
- Industry: Automotive
- Founded: 1965; 61 years ago
- Headquarters: Sandy Springs, Georgia, U.S.
- Key people: Adam Chamberlain (President & CEO)
- Products: Luxury Vehicles; Commercial Vehicles
- Number of employees: 11,069
- Parent: Mercedes-Benz Group
- Website: mbusa.com

Mercedes-Benz USA (MBUSA) is the distributor for Mercedes-Benz passenger cars in the United States, headquartered in Sandy Springs, a suburb of Atlanta, Georgia.

In 1952, businessman Max Hoffman became the sole importer of Mercedes-Benz cars to the United States. However, with the relative success the brand's cars enjoyed in the 1950s, Daimler was no longer content with selling through a middleman, and sought to start its own American operation. It thus entered a partnership with the struggling Studebaker-Packard Corporation in 1957. Though Mercedes sales shot up from just 36 in 1953 to around 12,000 by 1959, it did not satisfy Daimler, and was also hindered by Studebaker's woes, with the US factory in South Bend, Indiana ending in 1963 and production continuing in Canada only through 1966, as dealers dwindled and service quality suffered, thus Daimler executive Heinz Hoppe bought out the 14-year contract for approximately $5 million, plus distribution assets. With Studebaker faltering, trying to retain viable outlets, Daimler recruited about 200 top-performing Studebaker dealership owners, sending them to West Germany for brand training. With that, it was able to found its own independent subsidiary, Mercedes-Benz USA, in 1965, to integrate sales in the most important foreign market into the Group. Previously, the distribution was taken over by partners.

MBUSA employs about 1400 people and has been awarded several times by Fortune as a top employer. In July 2015, MBUSA's headquarters were relocated from Montvale, New Jersey to Sandy Springs, Georgia. This was to move about 1000 employees to the region and create new jobs to the northern suburb of Atlanta.

Mercedes-Benz USA was the name sponsor of Louisiana Superdome from 2011 to 2021. In 2015, the company also acquired the naming rights to the Mercedes-Benz Stadium, home to the NFL franchise Atlanta Falcons, and MLS franchise Atlanta United FC.
