= Northside Tower =

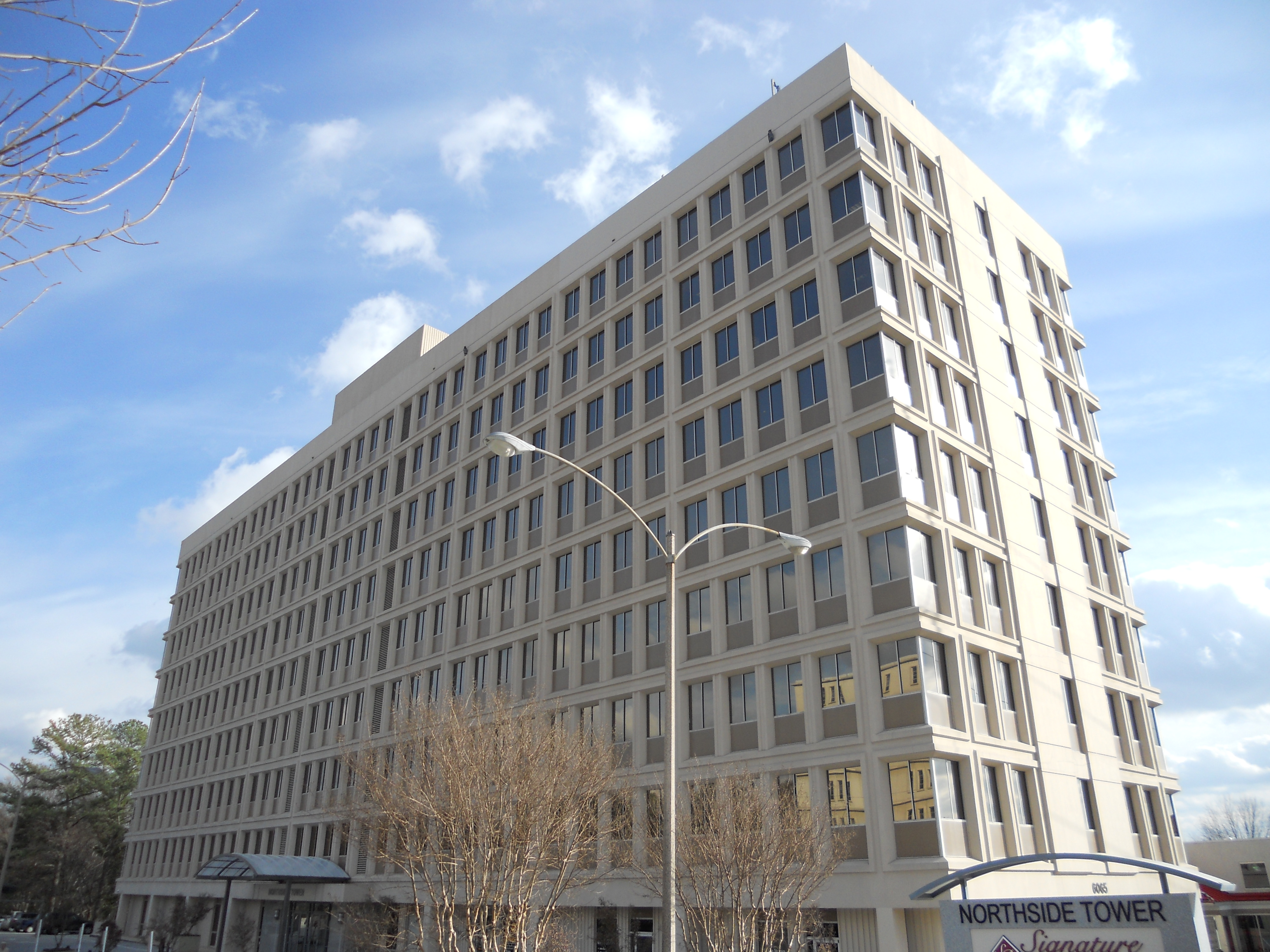
- Interactive map of the Northside Tower area

General information
- Type: Commercial offices
- Location: 6065 Roswell Road, Sandy Springs, Georgia
- Coordinates: 33.920152°N 84.378665°W
- Completed: 1971

Technical details
- Floor count: 9

Northside Tower is a nine-story, mid-rise office building located at 6065 Roswell Road in downtown Sandy Springs, Georgia, a northern suburb of Atlanta. The building offers 121,520 square feet (11,290 m^{2}) of office space, as well as street-level commercial vendors, including a restaurant. Construction of the building was completed in 1971, and the architectural design is in the form of early-seventies modern. The building is technically considered part of the Perimeter Center office sub-market. The significance of Northside Tower comes from the purpose it has served as an unofficial landmark for the center of Sandy Springs, even before the city's incorporation in 2005.
