= Springmont =

Private Montessori school in Sandy Springs, Georgia, United States

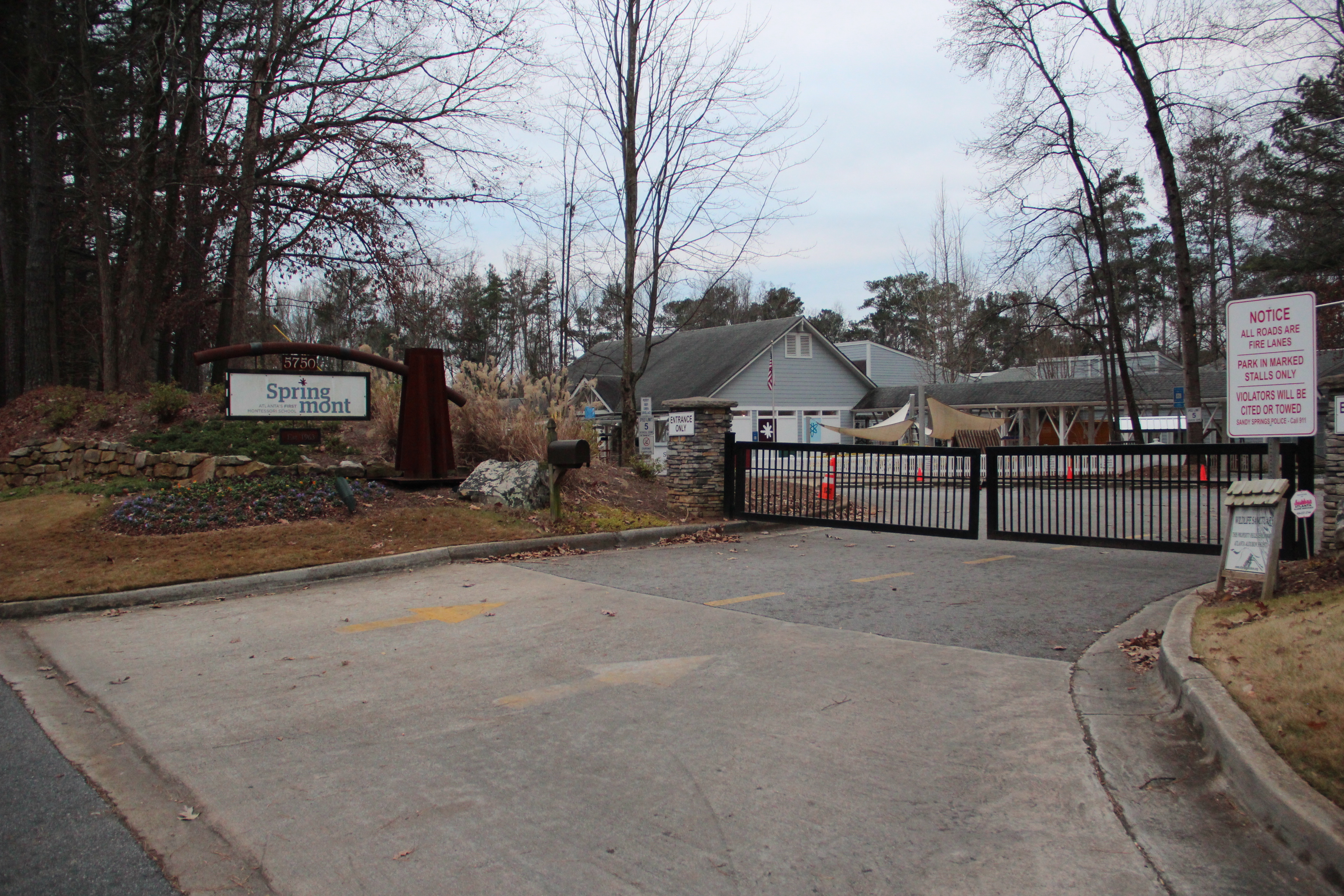

Location
- 5750 Long Island Drive NW; Sandy Springs, Georgia, Georgia 30101; United States; 33.912211°N 84.393065°W

Information
- School type: Montessori
- Motto: "Atlanta's First Montessori School"
- Founded: 1963
- Head of school: Elizabeth Lener
- Age: 18 months to 14 years
- Enrollment: 280
- Campus type: Suburban
- Accreditation: SACS, SAIS, AMI

Springmont is a private Montessori school located in Sandy Springs, Georgia, United States, in Metro Atlanta, at 5750 Long Island Drive. The school serves around 260 students rangingfrom 18 months to 14 years old. It is the oldest Montessori school in the Southeast.

== History ==
The school was founded in 1963 as the First Montessori Class of Atlanta by parents influenced by Maria Montessori's writings. The parents banded together to send a teacher to Italy for training in Montessori methods, and the school opened in a spare classroom at Pace Academy. The next year the school grew to two classrooms, and as it expanded it moved around the Sandy Springs community, renting space from area schools and churches. Reflecting the school's growth, its name was changed to First Montessori School of Atlanta during this period.

In 1971, the school bought acreage on Long Island Drive and contracted with the noted Atlanta architecture firm Finch, Alexander, Barnes, Rothschild, and Pascal (perhaps best known for building Atlanta–Fulton County Stadium). A 1972 article in Progressive Architecture reported on how the school was designed so the building itself was a teaching tool. The first classes at the Long Island site were held in September 1973.

Over the years the school continued to add new grades and more space. It acquired a neighboring house (currently the home of the Fine Arts program). By 2001, with the addition of a middle school program, the school offered programs ranging from toddlerhood to adolescence.

In 2008 the school expanded again, building a new media center and elementary building. The buildings were designed to be environmentally friendly (including geothermal heating, recycled building materials, and non-toxic finishes) and, like the school's original building, support the Montessori learning philosophy.

As the school's fiftieth anniversary approached, the name was changed from First Montessori School of Atlanta to Springmont.

== The school today ==
Springmont is a board-governed school accredited by the Southern Association of Colleges and Schools and the Southern Association of Independent Schools, and recognized by the Association Montessori Internationale. It is also a member of the Atlanta Area Association of Independent Schools (AAAIS), Georgia Independent School Association (GISA, the National Association of Independent Schools (NAIS) and the North American Montessori Teachers' Association (NAMTA).

The school has two campuses. The main campus, in Sandy Springs, consists of four buildings on seven acres. The other campus is the Landschool, an 86-acre retreat located near Summerville. The landschool is used as an outdoor classroom and nature lab for Springmont students, who begin visiting it on overnight trips during elementary. On overnight adventures, students participate in team-building and group development activities, while also learning about the natural history of plant and animal life in the region. The facility is situated in the foothills of the Appalachian Trail, where students are immersed in experiential learning opportunities. A naturalist provides lessons in edible plants and finding a water source and safe habitat while exploring nature. Students make their own rope from bark, learn to start a fire from flint in the fire pit and grind ochre for painting. These excursions offer students connections to the natural world and to themselves. These outings also offer time for critical analysis, decision making and opportunities for intellectual, creative, social and physical engagement beyond the classroom.

Along with a classic Montessori education, the school also offers a fine arts program, music, physical education, and Spanish and Latin along with a wide variety of enrichment activities. Resource teachers in art and music advise classroom teachers and also provide instruction adding dimension to the daily curriculum by infusing the students' education with opportunities for creative expression, explorations of culture and connections to oneself in ways only accessible via the arts. Students use bells and Orff instruments, learn drumming and rhythm, and experience chorus and dance.

Ongoing traditions at the school include a history of community service projects; the Montessori Mile, a roadrace during the school's homecoming weekend; and a musical put on by the elementary students each spring.
