= Eva Galambos =

German-American politician (1928–2015)

1st Mayor of Sandy Springs
- In office December 1, 2005 – January 7, 2014
- Preceded by: Position created
- Succeeded by: Rusty Paul

Personal details
- Born: Eva Cohn; July 1, 1928 Berlin, Germany
- Died: April 19, 2015 (aged 86) Atlanta, Georgia, U.S.
- Education: University of Georgia (BBA); University of Illinois at Urbana–Champaign (MA); Georgia State University (PhD)
- Known for: First mayor of Sandy Springs, Georgia, U.S.

Eva Cohn Galambos (July 1, 1928 – April 19, 2015) was a German-born American economist and a politician who served as the first mayor of Sandy Springs, Georgia. She served as the city's inaugural Mayor from December 1, 2005, until January 7, 2014, when Rusty Paul took office as the city's second mayor.

== Early life and education ==
Eva Cohn was born in Berlin, Germany, and her father was a judge. He was ousted from his position, along with other prominent Jews, in 1933 when Adolf Hitler came to power. The family then moved to Genoa, Italy, where they lived for six years before moving to the United States and settling in Athens, Georgia, where her father got a job at the University of Georgia with the help of prominent alumnus Harold Hirsch. Galambos attended Athens High School and graduated as valedictorian in 1944. She later graduated from the University of Georgia in 1948 with a Bachelor of Business Administration degree. Later in life she earned a master's degree (M.A.) in labor and industrial relations from the University of Illinois and a Ph.D. in economics from Georgia State University. She was the recipient of the 2011 Andrew Young School Distinguished Alumni Award from the Andrew Young School of Policy Studies at Georgia State University.

== Labor activism ==
An activist for workers, Galambos landed her first professional job as associate editor of the Atlanta Journal of Labor, writing local copy to interest the union members. When ending rent control came up for discussion in the Atlanta City Council in 1950, Galambos noted it was still difficult to find affordable housing in Atlanta. While "thanked" for her research, the practice, adopted in New York, was not enacted in a Southern city more sensitive to issues of government overreach. Galambos later obtained a position, working on behalf of the International Association of Machinists.

She was a labor economist for many years, teaching at Clark Atlanta University and Georgia State University.

== Politics ==
Galambos played a central role in the thirty year effort to incorporate Sandy Springs as an independent city, culminating in her election as its first mayor in November 2005. From 1975 to 2005, she served as president of the Committee for Sandy Springs, the organization leading the effort for incorporation. Residents of Sandy Springs, a suburban community north of Atlanta, had felt that they contributed substantial resources to Fulton County without receiving adequate services in return. Initially motivated by a desire to avoid annexation by Atlanta, the push for incorporation grew into a broader movement for local control and self-governance. However, state laws barring new cities from forming within three miles of existing municipalities prevented Sandy Springs from incorporating, and attempts to change the law was consistently blocked by the Democratic-controlled Georgia House of Representatives. This changed when the Legislature shifted to Republican control in 2005. Galambos was also a co-founder and former secretary of Sandy Springs Revitalization; founder of Sandy Springs Clean and Beautiful; chairwoman of the services committee for the Sandy Springs Council of Neighborhoods; former chairwoman of the Fulton County Public Housing Authority; and founder of Sandy Springs Civic Roundtable.

== Personal life ==
Galambos met her husband John while they were both undergraduates at the University of Georgia. In 1960, they moved to Sandy Springs and had three children. She died of cancer on April 19, 2015, at the age of 86. Her funeral was held at Temple Kehillat Chaim in Roswell, Georgia on April 21, 2015.

== Bibliography ==
- Eva Galambos (1996). What's in a Name?. Northwest Pub. ISBN 9780761004585.

Political offices
Preceded by Inaugural Mayor	Mayor of Sandy Springs, Georgia; 2005–2014	Succeeded by Rusty Paul
