= Concourse at Landmark Center =

Coordinates: 33.916°N 84.355°W

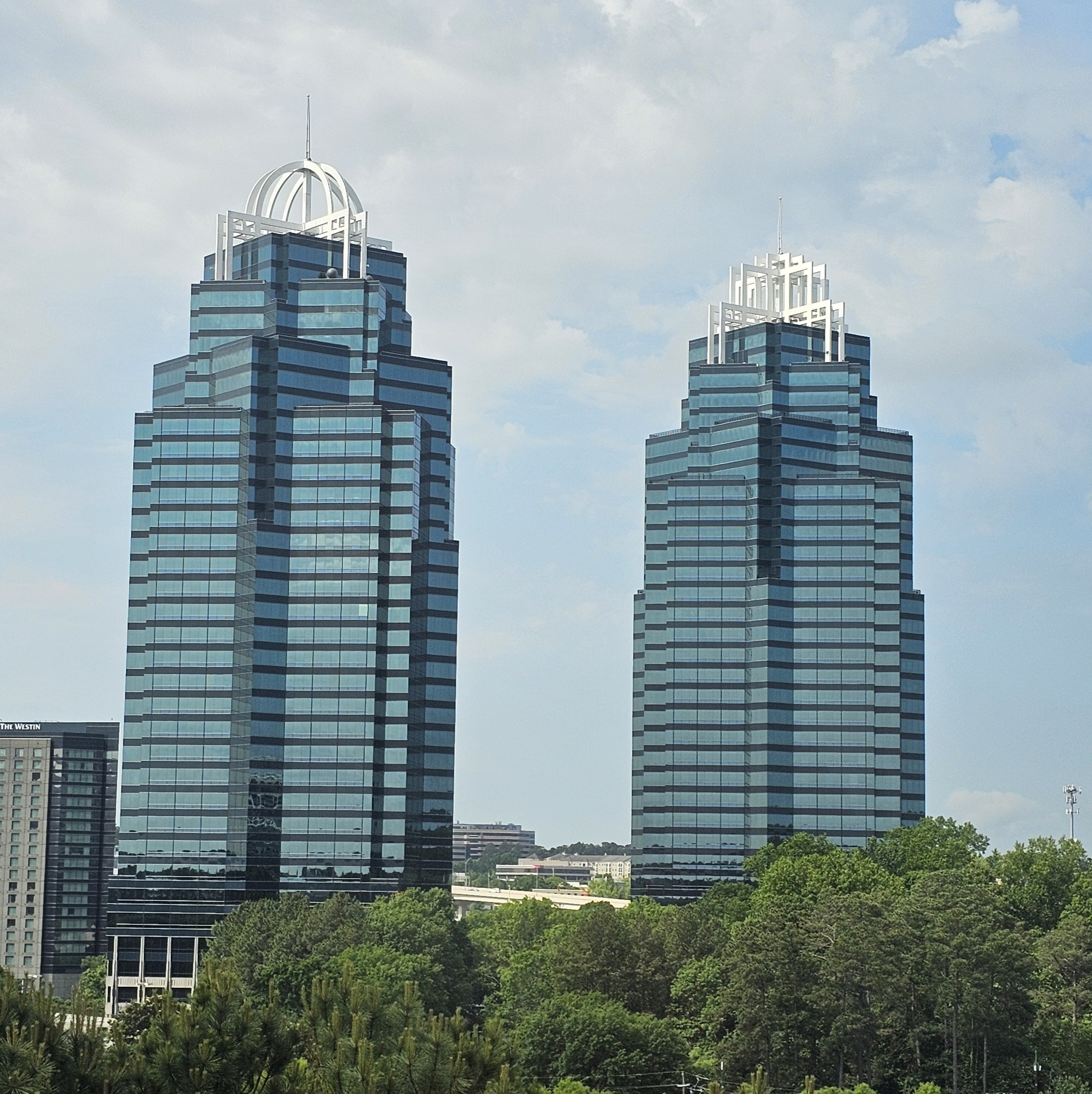
- Concourse at Landmark Center in 2024
- Interactive map of the Concourse at Landmark Center area

General information
- Status: Completed
- Type: Commercial
- Location: Sandy Springs, Georgia, United States
- Completed: Concourse Center One: 1984; Westin Atlanta Perimeter North: 1986; Concourse Corporate Center V: 1988; Concourse Corporate Center VI: 1991
- Owner: Building and Land Technology (BLT)
- Operator: Regent Partners

Height
- Roof: 570 ft (170 m)

Technical details
- Floor count: 34; 34; 20; 8; 8
- Floor area: 2,100,000 sq ft (200,000 m^{2})

Design and construction
- Architect: Thompson, Ventulett, Stainback & Associates
- Structural engineer: Uzun + Case, LLC
- Main contractor: Thompson Company, Inc.

Website
- www.concourse-atl.com

Concourse at Landmark Center is a real estate development in metro Atlanta's Perimeter Center business district, in the city of Sandy Springs, Georgia, United States. Built in phases between 1984 and 1991, it is a 70-acre planned community with two 34-story office towers (colloquially called the "King and Queen Towers"), several low-rise office buildings, a Westin hotel, and a health club, all set in landscaped grounds around a human-made lake.

Set at the northeastern corner of the junction of two of Atlanta's busiest highways (Interstate 285 and Georgia 400), the Concourse, with its blue glass towers, was a major addition to the Atlanta skyline for commuters traveling to and from the north side of suburban Atlanta. It houses several company headquarters, including those of Newell Brands, CKH Group, CodeMettle, Quikrete, and Allconnect.

== Description ==
Completed in 1988 and 1991, the 34-story towers are officially Concourse Corporate Center V and VI, but are known locally as "the King and Queen towers" because their white lattice crowns resemble the heads of chess pieces. The squared-top "king" tower (Corporate Center VI) is on the immediate east side of 400, and the round arcs of the "queen" tower (Corporate Center V) are in turn immediately east of it. At 570 feet (173.7 m) and 553 feet (168.6 m) to their spire tops, these are the two tallest suburban buildings in the United States, and 14th and 17th in metro Atlanta (including The Atlantic, 13th). Within Perimeter Center, they are followed by Three Ravinia Drive in Dunwoody, and Park Towers II and I in Sandy Springs, the only others to be true skyscrapers over 330 feet (100 m).

The colored lights on the tops of the towers are occasionally changed to mark special occasions. For example, the towers have been lit up green in March to celebrate St. Patrick's Day. The towers were illuminated in purple in honor of Prince following his death in April 2016. The towers also light up in support of certain causes. For example, every spring, the towers glow pink for breast cancer awareness. In 2009, the lights became green to show support for recycling, as part of the owners' program to reduce waste and electricity usage. For December 2017, the towers were lit blue and orange to raise awareness for Crohn's disease, on behalf of the Crohn's & Colitis Foundation; local Georgia Bulldogs fans mistook these colors as support for the Auburn Tigers football team. In November 2021, they were purple as part of World Prematurity Day.

As of April 2026, Both of these buildings have an ownership group of Atlanta-Based Regent Partners, which was acquired by Regent Partners in late 2012.

== Redevelopment plans ==
In 2016, plans were submitted for a pedestrian-friendly mixed-use development which would act as an expansion to both Concourse at Landmark Center. Plans calls for a 5-story, 125-room boutique hotel connected to an existing parking structure at the intersection of Peachtree Dunwoody Road and Hammond Drive; a 5-story, 270-unit “high-end” apartment building atop a “concrete podium”; and 24,500 square feet of restaurant and retail space in three buildings. The apartment building would be built on a plat that is currently zoned for a four-story office building, which would have been a mirror-image of an existing structure adjacent to the site.
