= Grand Concourse =

Grand Concourse can refer to:

- Grand Concourse (Bronx), a boulevard in New York City
- Grand Concourse (St. John's), an integrated walkway network in Newfoundland and Labrador
- Grand Concourse (restaurant), an eatery owned by Landry's, Inc. in Pittsburgh

== See also ==
- Grand Concourse Apartments, in Miami
- Grand Concourse buses
