= Concourse Program at MIT =

Learning community at the Massachusetts Institute of Technology

The Concourse Program is a freshman learning community at the Massachusetts Institute of Technology (MIT). Concourse admits up to fifty select MIT freshmen a year who are interested in understanding the breadth of human knowledge and the larger context of their science and engineering studies. Concourse has been recognized with the 2011 Irwin Sizer Award for Most Significant Improvement to MIT Education.

== History ==
Concourse began in 1970 as an experimental project initiated by Professors Louis Bucciarelli and David Oliver of the Department of Aeronautics and Astronautics and sponsored by the Commission on MIT Education. The founding staff members (later known as the Clock Group) came from a variety of academic disciplines. From science and engineering were Ronald Bruno, Louis Bucciarelli, Duncan Foley, Martin Horowitz, Daniel Kemp, David Oliver, and Brian Schwartz. They were joined by Nancy Dworsky and Travis Merritt from the humanities. In fall 1970, the group ran a seminar titled "From Earth to Moon: Fact, Fiction, and Fantasy."

In spring 1971, Concourse received academic and budgetary approval, along with permission to enroll up to 35 freshmen in the fall (i.e., class of 1975). The common room and office space were in building 35. Nancy McFarland was the administrative assistant. Jeffrey Hankoff, Adrian Houtsma, Karl Linn, and Robert J. Silbey joined the staff.

Past directors include David Adler, Jerome "Jerry" Lettvin, and Robert M. Rose (1989-2009). Cheryl Butters was the program administrator from 1975 until her retirement from MIT at the end of January 2011.

The program had office and classroom space on the second floor of the old barracks building (MIT building 20; the lounge was room 20C-221), where it resided until the building's demolition in 1998 to make way for the Stata Center. It now resides in the Dorrance Building (MIT building 16) at the center of the central section of campus and along the extension of the Infinite Corridor.

== Present Program ==
Since 2009, new leadership at Concourse has been gradually returning its curriculum to its interdisciplinary roots. The humanities component has been reinvigorated with two foundational Fall course which address the 'fundamental questions': CC.110 "Becoming Human: Ancient Greek Perspectives on the Best Life" and CC.113 "Ancient Greek Philosophy and Mathematics". All freshmen in Concourse take one of these two HASS-H, CI-H courses. The courses are linked by a Friday lunch and seminar series that is also required of all freshmen.

As a freshman learning community, Concourse teaches the math and science General Institute Requirements of physics, chemistry, calculus, and differential equations. The Concourse Integration Seminar bridges the humanities and the sciences by exploring questions about the origins of science and the distinct human choices that have produced modern scientific institutions. The aim is to teach students the intellectual-historical context of the present so that they can learn to identify and evaluate the unspoken assumptions that underlie the modern perspective.

== Articles ==
- "Concourse: 40 years of integrating freshman science and humanities," MIT News (April 6, 2011).
- Kris Guay, "Concourse, of course," MIT Admissions News (March 30, 2011).
- John Keck, "Big Changes at Concourse New Academic Offerings, Administrator Cheryl Butters Retires," Parents News (Spring 2011), 2.
