= Three Ravinia Drive =

Skyscraper in Atlanta

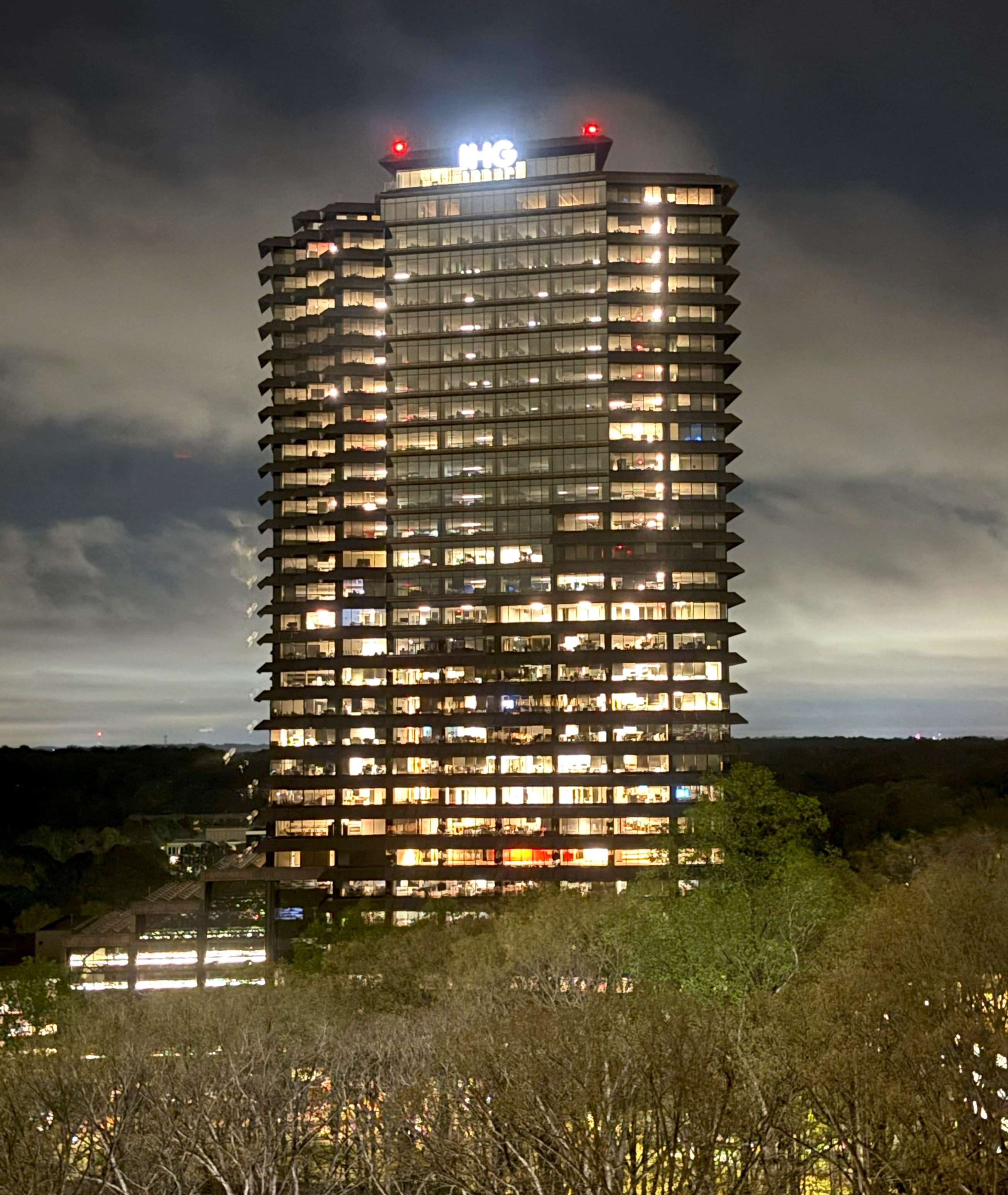
- Three Ravinia Drive in Dunwoody
- Interactive map of the Three Ravinia Drive area

General information
- Status: Completed
- Architectural style: Postmodern
- Location: Dunwoody, Georgia, U.S.
- Coordinates: 33.9208°N 84.335°W
- Completed: 1991
- Owner: Joint venture between Estein USA and Vanderbilt Office Properties

Height
- Height: 444 ft (135 m)

Technical details
- Floor count: 31
- Floor area: 868,769 sq ft (80,711 m²)

Design and construction
- Architects: Kevin Roche / John Dinkeloo & Associates
- Developer: Gerald Hines Interests

Three Ravinia Drive is a skyscraper located in the city of Dunwoody, in metropolitan Atlanta.

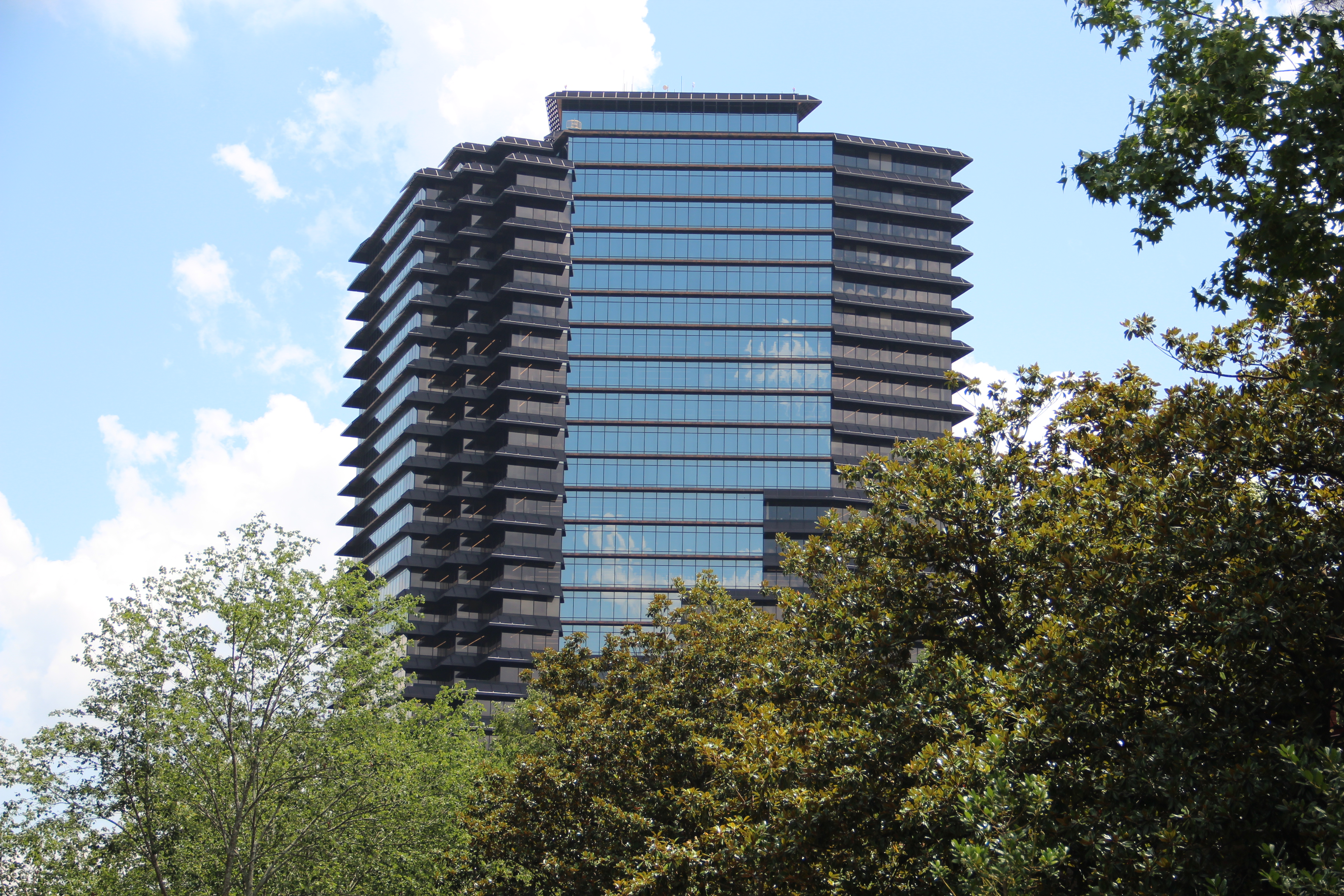
Three Ravina Drive in 2017

Standing 31 stories and 444 feet (135 meters) tall, it is the tallest building in Dunwoody. Ravinia was developed by Gerald Hines Interests of Houston, Texas, in 1991. It is part of a large business complex that includes the twin 17-story towers of One and Two Ravinia Drive, a 15-story Crowne Plaza Hotel and a park.

The tower is used mostly for commercial office space. It is part of the Perimeter Center business district, and is also the regional headquarters for the Americas for InterContinental Hotels Group.
