= Jason Alexander =

American actor (born 1959)

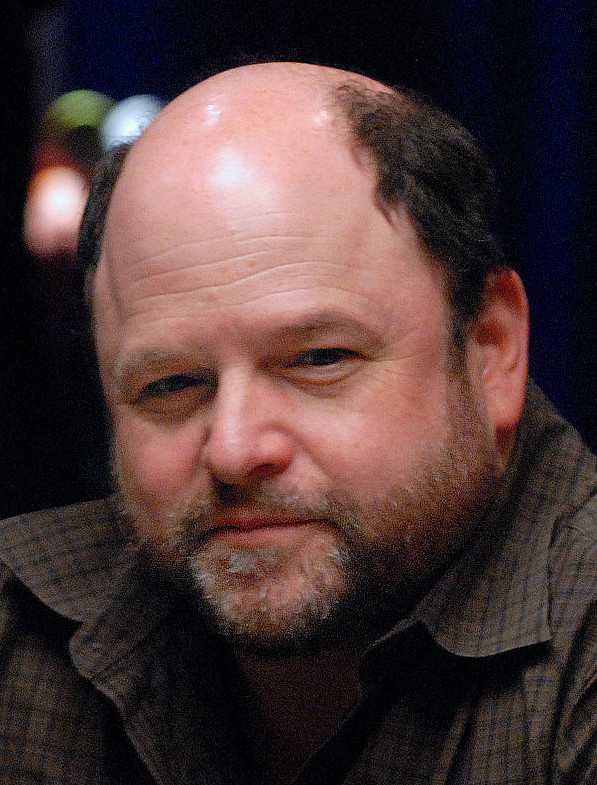
- Alexander in 2009
- Born: Jay Scott Greenspan; September 23, 1959 (age 67); Newark, New Jersey, U.S.
- Occupations: Actor; comedian; director; podcaster; singer; presenter; poker player
- Years active: 1981–present
- Spouse: Daena Title (m. 1982)
- Children: 2
- Alexander's speaking voice Celebrating the retirement of Cantor Jack of Parsippany-Troy Hills, New Jersey's Adath Shalom.

Jason Alexander (born Jay Scott Greenspan; September 23, 1959) is an American actor and comedian. Over the course of his career, he has received an Emmy Award and a Tony Award as well as nominations for four Golden Globe Awards. He gained stardom for his role as George Costanza in the NBC sitcom Seinfeld (1989–1998), for which he won a Screen Actors Guild Award for Outstanding Performance by a Male Actor in a Comedy Series and was nominated for seven consecutive Primetime Emmy Awards for Outstanding Supporting Actor in a Comedy Series and four Golden Globe Awards for Best Supporting Actor in Television.

Alexander made his Broadway debut originating the role of Joe in Stephen Sondheim's Merrily We Roll Along in 1981. He remained active on Broadway acting in the musicals The Rink in 1984 and the Neil Simon play Broadway Bound in 1986. He then starred in Jerome Robbins' Broadway in 1989, for which he won the Tony Award for Best Actor in a Musical. His subsequent theatre roles include the touring production of The Producers from 2003 to 2004 and replacing Larry David in the original 2015 Broadway production of Fish in the Dark. He has also directed several plays such as the original 2023 Broadway production of The Cottage.

His film roles include Pretty Woman (1990), Jacob's Ladder (1990), Coneheads (1993), The Paper (1994), Dunston Checks In (1996), Shallow Hal (2001), and Hachi: A Dog's Tale (2009). He voiced the gargoyle Hugo in the Disney film The Hunchback of Notre Dame (1996) and the titular role in Duckman (1994–1997). He was the narrator for the documentary film Sideshow: Alive on the Inside (1999). For his role in Dream On (1994) he was nominated for a Primetime Emmy Award for Outstanding Guest Actor in a Comedy Series.

== Early life and education ==
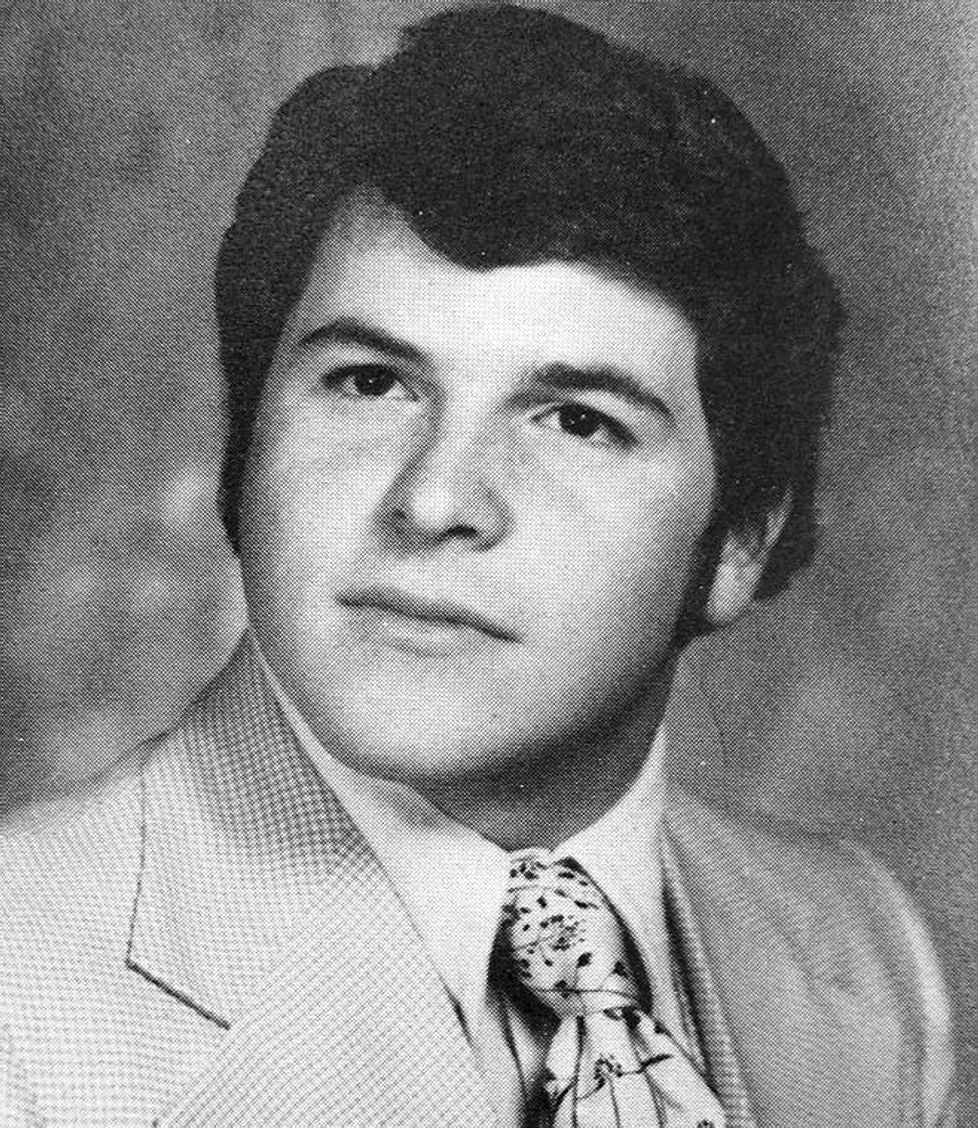
Alexander as a senior at Livingston High School in 1977

Alexander was born on September 23, 1959, in Newark, New Jersey to a Jewish family, the son of Ruth Minnie (née Simon), a nurse and health care administrator, and Alexander B. Greenspan, an accounting manager. Alexander later borrowed his father's first name to create his stage name, Jason Alexander.

Alexander grew up in Maplewood and Livingston, New Jersey, and is a 1977 graduate of Livingston High School. Interested in magic from an early age, he initially hoped to be a magician, but while attending a magic camp was told that his hands were too small for card magic. He became interested in theater, eventually realizing, "Wait a minute—the whole thing's an illusion. Nothing up there is real" and that theater itself was "a magic trick". He then decided to pursue a theater career.

After high school, he studied theater at Boston University. He wanted to pursue classical acting, but a professor redirected him toward comedy after noticing his physique, remarking, "I know your heart and soul are Hamlet, but you will never play Hamlet." Alexander left Boston University without a degree after his third year to take a full-time acting job in New York City. The university awarded him an honorary degree in 1995.

== Career ==
=== 1980–1999: Broadway debut and Seinfeld ===
Alexander began his acting career on the New York stage and is an accomplished singer and dancer. Alexander made his film debut in 1981 in the summer camp slasher film The Burning. On Broadway he appeared in Stephen Sondheim's Merrily We Roll Along in 1981, Kander & Ebb's The Rink in 1984, Neil Simon's Broadway Bound in 1986, Accomplice in 1990, and Jerome Robbins' Broadway in 1989, for which he garnered the 1989 Tony Award for Best Actor in a Musical. Frank Rich of The New York Times wrote of his performance "Jason Alexander, the evening's delightful narrator, accomplishes the seemingly impossible: he banishes the memory of Zero Mostel from the role of Pseudolus in A Funny Thing Happened on the Way to the Forum".

In addition to his roles as an insensitive, money-hungry lawyer in Pretty Woman in 1990, Alexander has appeared in Jacob's Ladder in 1990, Coneheads in 1993, The Paper and North in 1994, The Last Supper in 1995, Dunston Checks In in 1996, Love! Valour! Compassion! in 1997, Denial in 1998, and Love and Action in Chicago in 1999. Alexander starred in several commercials during the 1980s. Among them were commercials for Hershey's Kisses; Delta Gold potato chips; Miller Lite beer; McDonald's McDLT hamburger; Pabst Blue Ribbon beer; Levi's 501 jeans; Sony Watchman TV; and Western Union wire transfer. Before Seinfeld, Alexander appeared in commercials for John Deere and McDonald's and in the short-lived CBS sitcoms E/R (1984) and Everything's Relative (1987).

Alexander is best known as one of the key cast members of the award-winning television sitcom Seinfeld, where he played the bumbling George Costanza (Jerry Seinfeld's character's best friend since childhood). He was nominated for seven Primetime Emmy Awards and four Golden Globe Awards for the role, but did not win any, mainly due to his co-star Michael Richards winning for his role as Cosmo Kramer. He did, however, win the 1995 Screen Actors Guild Award for Outstanding Performance by a Male Actor in a Comedy Series.

Concurrently with his Seinfeld role, he had a part in the ABC sitcom Dinosaurs as Al "Sexual" Harris (who frequently engaged in sexual harassment) as well as other characters from 1991 to 1994. For his role in an episode of Dream On, Alexander was nominated for a Primetime Emmy Award for Outstanding Guest Actor in a Comedy Series in 1994. Alexander voiced the lead character in the animated series Duckman (1994–1997) and voiced Catbert, the evil director of human resources, in the short-lived animated series Dilbert from 1999 to 2000, based on the then-popular comic strip. In January 1995, he did a commercial for Rold Gold pretzels to be broadcast during the Super Bowl. The commercial depicts him with Frasier dog Eddie jumping out of an airplane with a parachute over the stadium. After the commercial, the audience is brought back to a supposedly live feed of the playing field hearing startled sports commentators as Alexander and the dog land in the field to wild applause.

Alexander appeared in the 1995 TV version of the Broadway musical Bye Bye Birdie, as Conrad Birdie's agent, Albert Peterson. He guest-starred in episode 8 of the 1996 variety show Muppets Tonight. He voiced the gargoyle Hugo in Disney's 1996 animated film The Hunchback of Notre Dame and its direct-to-video sequel, The Hunchback of Notre Dame II. Alexander voiced the character Abis Mal in the 1994 film The Return of Jafar and the 1994-1995 TV series based on the 1992 film Aladdin.

In 1997, he appeared in Cinderella, a remake of Rodgers and Hammerstein's Cinderella, alongside Whitney Houston, Brandy Norwood, and Whoopi Goldberg. His other Disney voice work includes House of Mouse in 2001 and the 2012 video game Kingdom Hearts 3D: Dream Drop Distance. He has dabbled in directing, starting with 1996's For Better or Worse and 1999's Just Looking. In 1999, Alexander presided over the New York Friars Club Roast event honoring Jerry Stiller, who played his father on Seinfeld; it featured appearances by Kevin James and Patton Oswalt, both Stiller's costars on The King of Queens. Alexander appeared in the 1999 Star Trek: Voyager episode "Think Tank" as Kurros, a genius alien trying to get Seven of Nine to serve on his ship.

In 1999, he provided narration for the documentary film Sideshow: Alive on the Inside.

=== 2000–2009: Solo-lead sitcoms and return to theater ===
Despite a successful career in film and stage, Alexander did not repeat his Seinfeld-level of success in television. 2001 marked his appearance as inept womanizer Mauricio in Shallow Hal and his first post-Seinfeld return to prime-time television: the heavily promoted but short-lived ABC sitcom Bob Patterson, which was canceled after five episodes. Alexander partially blames the show's failure on the country's mood after 9/11. Alexander made cameo appearances as himself in 2001 in the second season of Curb Your Enthusiasm, and he appeared in the show's seventh season with his three principal Seinfeld co-stars. He was featured in the Friends 2001 episode "The One Where Rosita Dies" as Earl, a suicidal supply manager. Phoebe calls him trying to sell him toner, learns about his problem, and tries to persuade him not to commit suicide. This is referenced in an episode of Malcolm in the Middle where Alexander appears as Leonard, a neurotic and critical loner. He describes himself as "free" and says he makes money "selling toner over the phone". Later in the episode, he is repeatedly harassed by a man named George.

He appeared in "One Night at Mercy", the first episode of the short-lived 2002 revival of The Twilight Zone, playing Death. He played the toymaker A.C. Gilbert in the 2002 film The Man Who Saved Christmas. He appeared in Kentucky Fried Chicken (KFC) commercials in 2002, including one with Barry Bonds of the San Francisco Giants and another with Trista Rehn of The Bachelorette. It was rumored that he quit doing these commercials due to KFC suppliers and slaughterhouses' alleged cruelty to animals, but he denied that in an interview with Adweek, saying, "That's PETA bullcrap. I loved working for KFC. I was targeted by PETA to broker something between them. I think KFC really stepped up to the plate; unfortunately PETA did not." In 2007, Alexander appeared in a commercial for the ASPCA that aired on cable TV stations. In 2018, Alexander portrayed Colonel Sanders in commercials for KFC, reprising his role from the 2002 campaign.

In 2003, he was cast opposite Martin Short in the Los Angeles production of Mel Brooks's The Producers. He appeared with Kelsey Grammer in the 2004 musical adaptation of Charles Dickens's A Christmas Carol, as Jacob Marley. He voiced Lil' Lightning in 101 Dalmatians II: Patch's London Adventure (2003), which went on to become one of his most signature roles. Alexander's second chance as a TV series lead, the CBS sitcom Listen Up (2004–05), also fell short of a second season. Alexander was the principal executive producer of the series, based very loosely on the life of the popular sports-media personality Tony Kornheiser. He performed on the Family Guy: Live in Vegas 2005 album. Alexander continued to appear in live stage shows, including Barbra Streisand's memorable birthday party in 2005 for Stephen Sondheim at the Hollywood Bowl, where he performed selections from Sweeney Todd: The Demon Barber of Fleet Street with Angela Lansbury. He featured in the 2005 Monk episode "Mr. Monk and the Other Detective" as Monk's rival, Marty Eels.

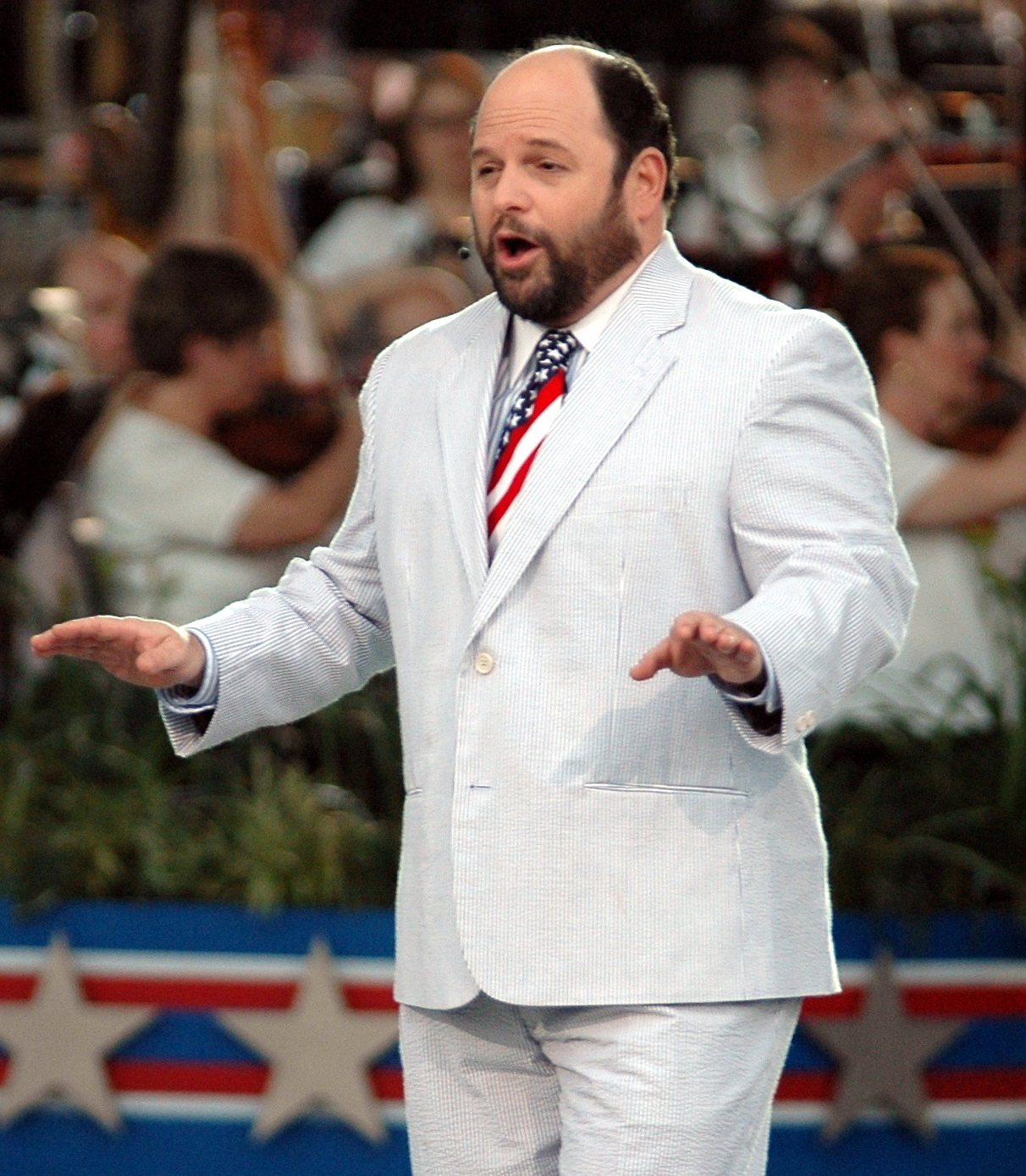
Alexander in 2006

In a 2006 appearance on Jimmy Kimmel Live!, Alexander demonstrated several self-defense techniques. Also that year, he hosted the PBS "A Capitol Fourth" celebrations in Washington, D.C., singing, dancing, and playing tuned drums. Alexander was featured as a recurring cast member in the second season of Everybody Hates Chris. He hosted the Comedy Central Roast of William Shatner. He was the artistic director of Reprise Theatre Company in Los Angeles from 2007 until it went defunct in 2013, where he previously directed Sunday in the Park with George, and directed its 2007 revival of Damn Yankees. In 2007, Alexander was a guest star in the third episode of the improv comedy series Thank God You're Here.

He has been a frequent guest and panelist on Bill Maher's Politically Incorrect in 1995, 1997 and 2000 and Real Time in 2006, 2009 and 2012; Hollywood Squares in 1999, 2002 and 2004; the Late Late Show in 2003, 2012, 2014 and 2015, with Craig Kilborn, Craig Ferguson, and James Corden; Late Show with David Letterman in 1989, 2000, and 2002; The Late Show with Stephen Colbert in 2015; and The Tonight Show Starring Jimmy Fallon in 2015. In 2008, Alexander guest-starred in the season four episode "Masterpiece" of the CBS show Criminal Minds as Professor Rothschild, a well-educated serial killer obsessed with the Fibonacci sequence who sends the team into a race against time to save his last victims. He returned in the same season to direct the episode "Conflicted", featuring the actor Jackson Rathbone.

Alexander hosted the LOL Sudbury opening night gala in Sudbury, Ontario, Canada in 2008, which was simulcast throughout Canada at 60 Cineplex theaters, a first for any comedy festival. He has lent his voice to several episodes of the Twilight Zone Radio Dramas. In 2008 and again in 2009, Alexander fronted Jason Alexander's Comedy Spectacular, a routine exclusive to Australia. The show consists of stand-up and improvisation and incorporates Alexander's musical talent. He is backed up by several well-known Australian comedians. His first time performing a similar show of this nature was in 2006's Jason Alexander's Comedy Christmas. In February/March 2010, Alexander starred in his show, The Donny Clay Experience, at the Planet Hollywood Resort in Las Vegas, Nevada. Donny Clay, whom he has portrayed in a tour of the United States and Orillia, Ontario, is a self-help guru in a similar mold to his Bob Patterson character. In 2009, he played Joseph in the Thomas Nelson audio Bible production The Word of Promise. The project featured a large ensemble of actors, including Jim Caviezel, Lou Gossett Jr., John Rhys-Davies, Jon Voight, Gary Sinise, Christopher McDonald, Marisa Tomei, and John Schneider. In 2009, Alexander had a small role in the film Hachi: A Dog's Tale as a train station manager.

=== 2010–present ===
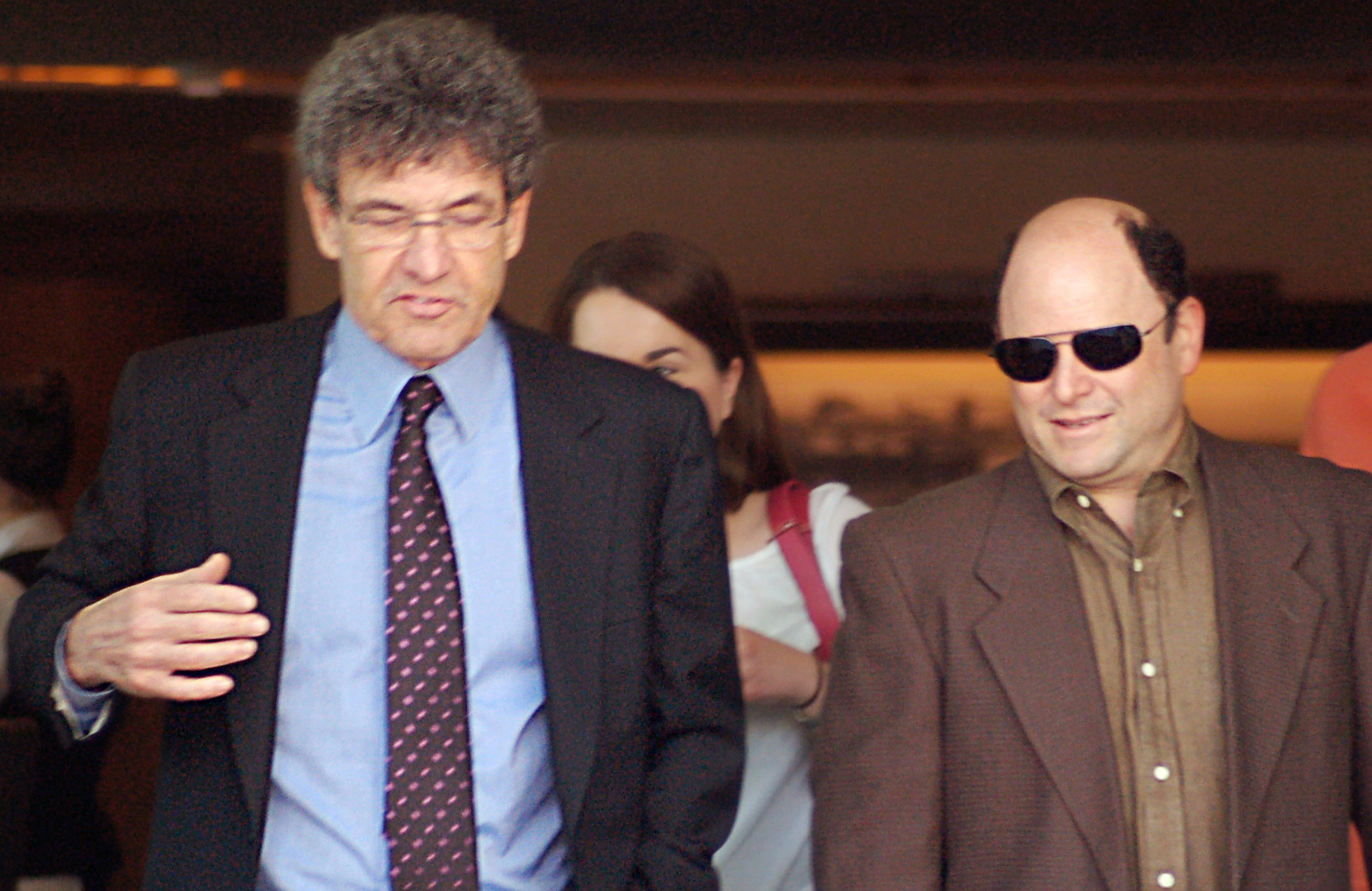
Alexander with Alan F. Horn in May 2010

He starred as Cosmo in the 2011 live action film A Fairly Odd Movie: Grow Up, Timmy Turner!. In 2011, Alexander was the guest star in an episode of Harry's Law, playing a high school teacher bringing a wrongful dismissal suit. In 2015, he replaced Larry David as the lead in David's Broadway play Fish in the Dark. He co-starred opposite Sherie Rene Scott in the 2017 world premiere of John Patrick Shanley's The Portuguese Kid at the Manhattan Theatre Club. In 2018, Alexander played Olix the bartender in The Orville. The same year, he portrayed Gene Lundy, a drama teacher, on two episodes of Young Sheldon. In 2020, 2021 and 2022, he reprised the role of Gene Lundy on one episode.

In 2019, Alexander appeared on The Marvelous Mrs. Maisel as Asher Friedman, a blacklisted Broadway playwright who is an old friend of Midge Maisel's father Abe Weissman. He won the Daytime Emmy Award for Outstanding Original Song for "The Bad Guys?" on Brainwashed By Toons (2020). In 2020, Alexander hosted the Saturday Night Seder, an online Passover Seder that featured many celebrities and benefited the CDC Foundation.

From February 2023 he co-presented Really? No, Really?, a weekly podcast in which he, co-host Peter Tilden, and their guests attempt to find answers "to life’s most baffling, intriguing, confusing and annoying questions". In July 2023, he made his Broadway directing debut with Sandy Rustin's comedy The Cottage. The cast includes Eric McCormack, Laura Bell Bundy and Lilli Cooper. In 2023, on the December 21 primetime CBS special Dick Van Dyke: 98 Years of Magic, Alexander performed two songs in conjunction with dance-performers and closed the show with a spoken tribute to Van Dyke.

== Personal life ==
Alexander has been married to Daena E. Title, cousin of director Stacy Title, since May 31, 1982. They have two sons, Gabriel and Noah.

Alexander performed a mentalism and magic act at The Magic Castle in Hollywood, California, from April 24 to 30, 2006, and he was later named The Academy of Magical Arts Parlor Magician of the Year for this act. He won the academy's Junior Achievement Award in 1989.

=== Charity ===
Alexander was the national spokesman for the Scleroderma Foundation, a leading organization dedicated to raising awareness of the disease and assisting those who are afflicted. In summer 2005, he appeared with Lee Iacocca in ads for DaimlerChrysler. Iacocca did the ads as part of a way to raise money for Denise Faustman's research on autoimmunity. Iacocca and Alexander both have loved ones whose lives have been adversely affected by autoimmunity.

Alexander competed on televised poker shows and in various tournaments. He appeared twice on Bravo's Celebrity Poker Showdown, winning the final table of the 8th season. Alexander won the $500,000 prize for the charity of his choice, The United Way of America, to help benefit the New Orleans area. Alexander played in the 2007 World Series of Poker main event, but he was eliminated on the second day. He returned in 2009, making it to day 3 of the event and finishing in the top 30% of the field. Alexander has appeared on NBC's Poker After Dark in the "Celebrities and Mentors" episode, finishing in 6th place after being eliminated by professional poker player Gavin Smith. He signed with PokerStars, where he plays under the screen name "J. Alexander". In 2021, Alexander competed in a virtual National Poker Tournament, hosted by the Children's Tumor Foundation, to raise money for Neurofibromatosis research.

=== Political views ===
==== Israel-Palestine ====
Alexander has been a prominent public supporter of the OneVoice initiative, which seeks out opinions from moderate Israelis and Palestinians who want to achieve a mutual peace agreement, through what it states is the silent majority of Israelis and Palestinians. On Real Time with Bill Maher, he said he had visited Israel many times and spoke about progress toward peace he had observed.

Alexander, who was interviewed at the event by Jewish News Syndicate, stated he supported the OneVoice Movement, and acknowledged an occupation of Palestine and called for a two-state solution, which was later criticized by Roz Rothstein, CEO of the pro-Israel education group StandWithUs. When asked about the IDF, Alexander stated that they were humane and noble, stating "some of the finest, most humane, most admirable, most noble-serving soldiers that I've ever seen" and that "there can never be any doubt that I am also an advocate for Israel". When asked about why he had repeatedly emceed the event, Alexander stated, "They don't understand first of all what [FIDF] is, and they see it as just a blanket support for Israeli military, and they don't understand how I can say that I'm an advocate for both sides. And given the fact that there are eyes on this event tonight, I thought it was important to get up and say, 'This is why I can advocate for this group and I can advocate for Israel, and I'm not blind to the fact that we're in conflict, and I hold everyone equally accountable, and I hold everyone equally to my heart.'" On November 6, 2015 he again emceed an event at The Beverly Hilton Hotel in California, which raised $31 million for "provid[ing] educational, cultural and recreational programs and facilities for IDF soldiers."

==== US politics ====
Alexander is a supporter of the Democratic Party. Alexander supports same-sex marriage and an assault weapons ban. In 2020, he campaigned for the Texas Democrats with former Seinfeld colleagues Julia Louis-Dreyfus and Larry David. He endorsed Barack Obama in 2012 and Joe Biden in 2020. Alexander has been an outspoken critic of the Trump administration and he has ridiculed Donald Trump over his dancing. He has called Republican Party senator Ted Cruz a jerk from the "jerk store" in reference to a joke from Seinfeld.

== Acting credits ==
=== Film ===
Year	Title	Role	Notes	Ref.
1981	The Burning	Dave		
1986	The Mosquito Coast	Clerk		
1986	Brighton Beach Memoirs	Pool Player		
1990	Pretty Woman	Philip Stuckey		
1990	White Palace	Neil		
1990	Jacob's Ladder	Mr. Geary		
1992	I Don't Buy Kisses Anymore	Bernie Fishbine		
1993	Sexual Healing	Frank	Short subject	
1993	Coneheads	Larry Farber		
1993	For Goodness Sake	VCR Customer	Short subject	
1994	The Paper	Marion Sandusky		
1994	North	North's Father		
1994	The Return of Jafar	Abis Mal	Voice; direct-to-video	
1994	Blankman	Larry Stone		
1995	For Better or Worse	Michael Makeshift	Also director	
1995	The Last Supper	The Anti-Environmentalist		
1996	Dunston Checks In	Robert Grant		
1996	The Hunchback of Notre Dame	Hugo	Voice	
1997	Love! Valour! Compassion!	Buzz Hauser		
1998	Denial	Art Witz		
1999	Madeline: Lost in Paris	Henri / Uncle Horst	Voice; direct-to-video	
1999	Love and Action in Chicago	Frank Bonner		
1999	Just Looking	Radio Announcer	Voice, uncredited; also director	
2000	The Adventures of Rocky and Bullwinkle	Boris Badenov		
2000	Let's Rap Fire Safety	Smoke Detector	Voice; short subject	
2001	The Trumpet of the Swan	Father	Voice	
2001	On Edge	Zamboni Phil		
2001	Shallow Hal	Mauricio Wilson		
2002	The Hunchback of Notre Dame II	Hugo	Voice, direct-to-video	
2003	101 Dalmatians II: Patch's London Adventure	Lil' Lightning	Voice, direct-to-video	
2006	Ira & Abby	Dr. Morris Saperstein		
2006	Hood of Horror	British Record Mogul		
2006	How to Go Out on a Date in Queens	Johnny		
2006	Farce of the Penguins	Penguin on Belly	Voice, direct-to-video	
2007	The Grand	Dr. Yakov Achmed		
2009	Rock Slyde	Mailman Stan		
2009	Hachi: A Dog's Tale	Carl Bollins		
2010	Quantum Quest: A Cassini Space Odyssey	Major Moron	Voice	
2011	The Voyages of Young Doctor Dolittle	Eugene	Voice; direct-to-video	
2012	Stars in Shorts	Sid Rosenthal		
2012	Delhi Safari	Male Flamingo, Hyena Cook	Voice; English dub	
2014	Lucky Stiff	Vinnie DiRuzzio		
2015	Wild Card	Pinchus "Pinky" Zion		
2015	Larry Gaye: Renegade Male Flight Attendant	Mr. Gaye		
2016	Tom and Jerry: Back to Oz	Mr. Bibb / The Nome King	Voice; direct-to-video	
2016	Best Worst Thing That Ever Could Have Happened	Himself	Documentary	
2020	My Boyfriend's Meds	Dr. Sternbach		
2020	Faith Based	Nicky Steele		
2023	Leo	Jayda's Dad	Voice	
2024	Stealing Pulp Fiction	Dr. Mendelbaum		
2025	The Electric State	Ted Finister		
2026	Jimmy	Louis B. Mayer		

=== Television ===
Year	Title	Role	Notes	Ref.
1981	Senior Trip	Pete	Television film	
1984–1985	E/R	Harold Stickley	15 episodes	
1986	Rockabye	Lt. Ernest Foy	Television film	
1987	Everything's Relative	Julian Beeby	10 episodes	
1988	Newhart	Ramming	Episode: "Courtin' Disaster"	
1989–1998	Seinfeld	George Costanza	Main role; 178 episodes	
1992–1993	Dinosaurs	Various voices	Recurring role; 7 episodes	
1993	Dream On	Randall Townsend	Episode: "Oral Sex, Lies and Videotape"	
1993–1998	Saturday Night Live	Himself	2 episodes	
1994–1997	Duckman	Eric Duckman (voice)	Main role; 70 episodes	
1994, 1998	The Larry Sanders Show	Himself	2 episodes	
1994	Aladdin	Abis Mal (voice)	Recurring role; 14 episodes	
1995	Bye Bye Birdie	Albert Peterson	Television film	
1995	47th Primetime Emmy Awards	Himself (co-host)	Television special	
1996	Muppets Tonight	Himself	Episode: "Jason Alexander"	
1996	The Nanny	Jack	Episode: "The Tart with Heart"	
1996	Sesame Street	Himself	Episode 3557	
1997	Remember WENN	Alan Ballinger	Episode: "Nothing Up My Sleeve"	
1997	Cinderella	Lionel	Television film	
1998–1999	Hercules	Poseidon (voice)	Recurring role; 7 episodes	
1999	Jingle Bells	Elf	Voice; Television film	
1999	Ultimate Trek: Star Trek's Greatest Moments	Captain James T. Kirk	Television special	
1999	Star Trek: Voyager	Kurros	Episode: "Think Tank"	
1999–2000	Dilbert	Catbert (voice)	Main role; 9 episodes	
2001, 2009	Curb Your Enthusiasm	Himself	Recurring role; 5 episodes	
2001	Friends	Earl	Episode: "The One Where Rosita Dies"	
2001	Bob Patterson	Bob Patterson	Main role; 10 episodes; also executive producer	
2001	The Legend of Tarzan	Zutho	Voice, episode: "Tarzan and the Face from the Past"	
2002	Son of the Beach	Tex Finklestein	Episode: "Penetration Island"	
2002	House of Mouse	Hugo	Voice; Episode: "Donald Wants to Fly"	
2002	The Twilight Zone	Death	Episode: "One Night at Mercy"	
2002	The Man Who Saved Christmas	A.C. Gilbert	Television film	
2003	Malcolm in the Middle	Leonard	Episode: "Future Malcolm"	
2004–2005	Listen Up	Tony Kleinman	Main role; also producer	
2004	A Christmas Carol	Jacob Marley	Television film	
2005	Monk	Marty Eels	Episode: "Mr. Monk and the Other Detective"	
2006	Odd Job Jack	Don	Voice; episode: "Twenty-One You're Dead"	
2006	Campus Ladies	Professor	Episode: "A Very Special Episode"	
2006–2007	Everybody Hates Chris	Principal Edwards	2 episodes	
2008	The New Adventures of Old Christine	Dr. Palmer	Episode: "One and a Half Men"	
2008	Criminal Minds	Prof. Rothchild	Episode: "Masterpiece"	
2009	Meteor	Dr. Chetwyn	2 episodes	
2010–2013	Fish Hooks	Mr. Nibbles	Voice; 3 episodes	
2010–2013	The Cleveland Show	Saul Friedman	Voice; 2 episodes	
2010, 2023	American Dad!	Sal / Mr. Orlando	Voice; 2 episodes	
2011	Glenn Martin, DDS	Brandon	Voice; episode: "GlenHog Day"	
2011	Franklin & Bash	Carter Lang	Episode: "Big Fish"	
2011	Harry's Law	Richard Cross	Episode: "Bad to Worse"	
2011	China, IL	Harold	Voice; 2 episodes	
2011	A Fairly Odd Movie: Grow Up, Timmy Turner!	Human Cosmo	Television film	
2011–2012	Dora the Explorer	Owl	Voice; 3 episodes	
2012	Two and a Half Men	Dr. Goodman	Episode: "The Straw in My Donut Hole"	
2012	Clipaholics	Narrator	Voice; main role	
2013	Community	Mountain Man	Episode: "Intro to Felt Surrogacy"	
2014	Comedians in Cars Getting Coffee	George Costanza	Episode: "George Costanza: The Over-Cheer"	
2014	Kirstie	Stanford Temple	Episode: "Maddie's Agent"	
2014	Comedy Bang! Bang!	Inspector Gantlet	Episode: "Jenna Fischer Wears a Floral Blouse & Black Heels"	
2014	How Murray Saved Christmas	Doc Holiday	Voice; Television film	
2014–2017	The Tom and Jerry Show	Rick (voice)	Voice; 11 episodes	
2015	Big Time in Hollywood, FL	Himself	Episode: "The Hand That Feeds"	
2015	Penn Zero: Part-Time Hero	Coach Wallace	Voice; episode: "Ultrahyperball"	
2015	Drunk History	William "Boss" Tweed	Episode: "Journalism"	
2015	League of Legends with Videogamedunkey	Himself	Episode: "Brucer Zin Zow"	
2015–2016	The Grinder	Cliff Bemis	4 episodes	
2015–2016	TripTank	Various voices	6 episodes	
2016	The Mark Lembeck Technique	Mark Lembeck	Pilot	
2017	Animals.	Algae	Voice, episode: "Rats"	
2017	The Simpsons	Bourbon Verlander	Voice; episode: "The Caper Chase"	
2017	Hit the Road	Ken Swallow	Main role; also co-creator, writer and executive producer	
2017–2018	Kody Kapow	Goji	Voice; recurring role	
2017, 2019	Robot Chicken	Krampus	Voice; 2 episodes	
2018–2022	Young Sheldon	Gene Lundy	5 episodes	
2018	Broadway: Beyond the Golden Age	Himself	Documentary	
2018–2019	The Orville	Olix	2 episodes	
2019	The Bug Diaries	Cicada	Voice; episode: "Worm's New Digs"	
2019	Richard Lovely	Mr. Mouse	Voice; Pilot	
2019	Pinky Malinky	Mayor Hop	Voice; recurring role	
2019	Mad About You	Himself	Episode: "Real Estate for Beginners"	
2019–present	Harley Quinn	Sy Borgman	Voice, 13 episodes	
2019–2022	The Marvelous Mrs. Maisel	Asher Friedman	4 episodes	
2021	The Conners	Pastor Phil	2 episodes	
2021	The Movies That Made Us	Himself	Episode: "Pretty Woman"	
2021	The Problem with Jon Stewart	Jeff Bezos	Episode: "Working-Class Economy"	
2022	Out of Office	Eliza's Dad	Television film	
2022–2024	Star Trek: Prodigy	Doctor Noum	Voice; 23 episodes	
2023	History of the World, Part II	Maurice Cheeks	Episode: "VI"	
2024	Rock, Paper, Scissors	Jonathan Fartjoke	Voice; episode: "Potato/The Fart Joke Debate"	
2024	Y llegaron de noche	Carl Laemmle	4 episodes	
2025	Lego Marvel Avengers: Strange Tails	Magneto	Voice; Disney+ special	
2026	The Bad Guys: The Series	D.B. Cougar	Voice; 3 episodes	
2026	Mating Season	Alan	Voice; episode: "The Copulatory Tie"	

=== Theater ===
Year	Title	Role	Venue	Ref.
1981	Merrily We Roll Along	Joe Josephson	Neil Simon Theatre, Broadway	
1982	Forbidden Broadway	Performer	Stage 72, Off-Broadway	
1984	The Rink	Lino/Lenny/Punk/Uncle Fausto	Al Hirschfeld Theatre, Broadway	
1985–1986	Personals	Louis/Others	Minetta Lane Theatre, Off-Broadway	
1986–1988	Broadway Bound	Stanley Jerome	Broadhurst Theatre, Broadway	
1989–1990	Jerome Robbins' Broadway	Narrator	Imperial Theatre, Broadway	
1990	Accomplice	Performer	Richard Rodgers Theater, Broadway	
1990	Light Up the Sky	Sidney Black	Union Square Theatre, Off-Broadway	
2000	Defiled	Harry Mendelssohn	Geffen Playhouse, Los Angeles	
2003–2004	The Producers	Max Bialystock	National Tour	
2006	The God of Hell	Director only	Geffen Playhouse, Los Angeles	
2008	The Odd Couple	Oscar Madison	Stage Reading	
2013	Finding Neverland	Charles Frohman	Workshop	
2013	Broadway Bound	Director only	Odyssey Theatre	
2015	Fish in the Dark	Norman Drexel (replacement)	Cort Theatre, Broadway	
2016	Windfall	Director only	Arkansas Repertory Theatre	
2017	The Portuguese Kid	Barry Dragonetti	Manhattan Theatre Club	
2019	The Last Five Years	Director only	Syracuse Stage	
2023	The Cottage	Director only	Helen Hayes Theater, Broadway	
2023	Gutenberg! The Musical!	Producer (one night only)	James Earl Jones Theatre, Broadway	
2024	Judgment Day	Sammy Campo	Chicago Shakespeare Theater	
2024	Fiddler on the Roof	Tevye	La Mirada Theatre for the Performing Arts	
2026	Sweeney Todd: The Demon Barber of Fleet Street	Director only	La Mirada Theatre for the Performing Arts	

=== Music videos ===
Year	Title	Artist	Role	Ref.
2007	"Celebrity"	Brad Paisley	Himself	
2007	"Online"	Brad Paisley	Geek; also director	
2012	"Trying Not to Love You"	Nickelback	Bud	
2021	"Cinderella Medley"	Todrick Hall & Brandy	Lionel	

=== Video games ===
Year	Title	Voice role	Ref.
1996	Disney's Animated Storybook: The Hunchback of Notre Dame	Hugo	
1996	The Hunchback of Notre Dame: Topsy Turvy Games	Hugo	
2012	Kingdom Hearts 3D: Dream Drop Distance	Hugo	

=== Director ===
Year	Title	Notes
1992	Seinfeld	Episode: "The Good Samaritan"
2006	Campus Ladies	Episode: "A Very Special Episode"
2007–2008	Everybody Hates Chris	2 episodes
2009	Criminal Minds	Episode: "Conflicted"
2010	'Til Death	Episode: "Snore Loser"
2012	Franklin & Bash	Episode: "Last Dance"
2012	Mike & Molly	Episode: "Vince Takes a Bath"
2023	Young Sheldon	Episode: "A Frat Party, a Sleepover and the Mother of All Blisters"

== Awards and nominations ==
Award	Year	Category	Nominated work	Result	Ref.
Daytime Emmy Awards	2020	Outstanding Original Song	Brainwashed By Toons	Won	
Daytime Emmy Awards	2020	Outstanding Writing for a Special Class Series	Brainwashed By Toons	Nominated	
Drama Desk Awards	1986	Outstanding Featured Actor in a Musical	Personals	Nominated	
Drama Desk Awards	1989	Outstanding Actor in a Musical	Jerome Robbins' Broadway	Won	
Primetime Emmy Awards	1992	Outstanding Supporting Actor in a Comedy Series	Seinfeld (episode: "The Note" + "The Tape")	Nominated	
Primetime Emmy Awards	1993	Outstanding Supporting Actor in a Comedy Series	Seinfeld (episode: "The Contest" + "The Outing")	Nominated	
Primetime Emmy Awards	1994	Outstanding Supporting Actor in a Comedy Series	Seinfeld (episode: "The Hamptons" + "The Opposite")	Nominated	
Primetime Emmy Awards	1994	Outstanding Guest Actor in a Comedy Series	Dream On (episode: "Oral Sex, Lies, and Videotape")	Nominated	
Primetime Emmy Awards	1995	Outstanding Supporting Actor in a Comedy Series	Seinfeld (episode: "The Gymnast" + "The Race")	Nominated	
Primetime Emmy Awards	1996	Outstanding Supporting Actor in a Comedy Series	Seinfeld (episode: "The Pool Guy" + "The Invitations")	Nominated	
Primetime Emmy Awards	1997	Outstanding Supporting Actor in a Comedy Series	Seinfeld (episode: "The Comeback")	Nominated	
Primetime Emmy Awards	1998	Outstanding Supporting Actor in a Comedy Series	Seinfeld (episode: "The Strike")	Nominated	
Golden Globe Awards	1992	Best Supporting Actor – Television	Seinfeld (season 3)	Nominated	
Golden Globe Awards	1993	Best Supporting Actor – Television	Seinfeld (season 4)	Nominated	
Golden Globe Awards	1994	Best Supporting Actor – Television	Seinfeld (season 5)	Nominated	
Golden Globe Awards	1997	Best Supporting Actor – Television	Seinfeld (season 8)	Nominated	
Screen Actors Guild Awards	1994	Outstanding Ensemble in a Comedy Series	Seinfeld	Won	
Screen Actors Guild Awards	1994	Outstanding Male Actor in a Comedy Series	Seinfeld	Won	
Screen Actors Guild Awards	1995	Outstanding Ensemble in a Comedy Series	Seinfeld	Nominated	
Screen Actors Guild Awards	1995	Outstanding Male Actor in a Comedy Series	Seinfeld	Nominated	
Screen Actors Guild Awards	1996	Outstanding Ensemble in a Comedy Series	Seinfeld	Won	
Screen Actors Guild Awards	1996	Outstanding Male Actor in a Comedy Series	Seinfeld	Nominated	
Screen Actors Guild Awards	1997	Outstanding Ensemble in a Comedy Series	Seinfeld	Won	
Screen Actors Guild Awards	1997	Outstanding Male Actor in a Comedy Series	Seinfeld	Nominated	
Screen Actors Guild Awards	1998	Outstanding Male Actor in a Comedy Series	Seinfeld	Nominated	
Tony Awards	1989	Best Actor in a Musical	Jerome Robbins' Broadway	Won	
