= Psychopath (disambiguation) =

A psychopath is a person characterized by persistent antisocial behavior, impaired empathy and remorse, and bold, disinhibited, and egocentric traits.

Psychopath may also refer to:

- Psychopath (1968 film), an Italian and German crime film
- The Psychopath (1966 film), a British horror film
- The Psychopath (1973 film), an American horror film
- Psychopaths (film), a 2017 American horror film
- Dard (2024 film), an Indian-Bangladeshi thriller film by Anonno Mamun, working title Psychopath
