= Alex Moffat =

American actor and comedian (born 1982)

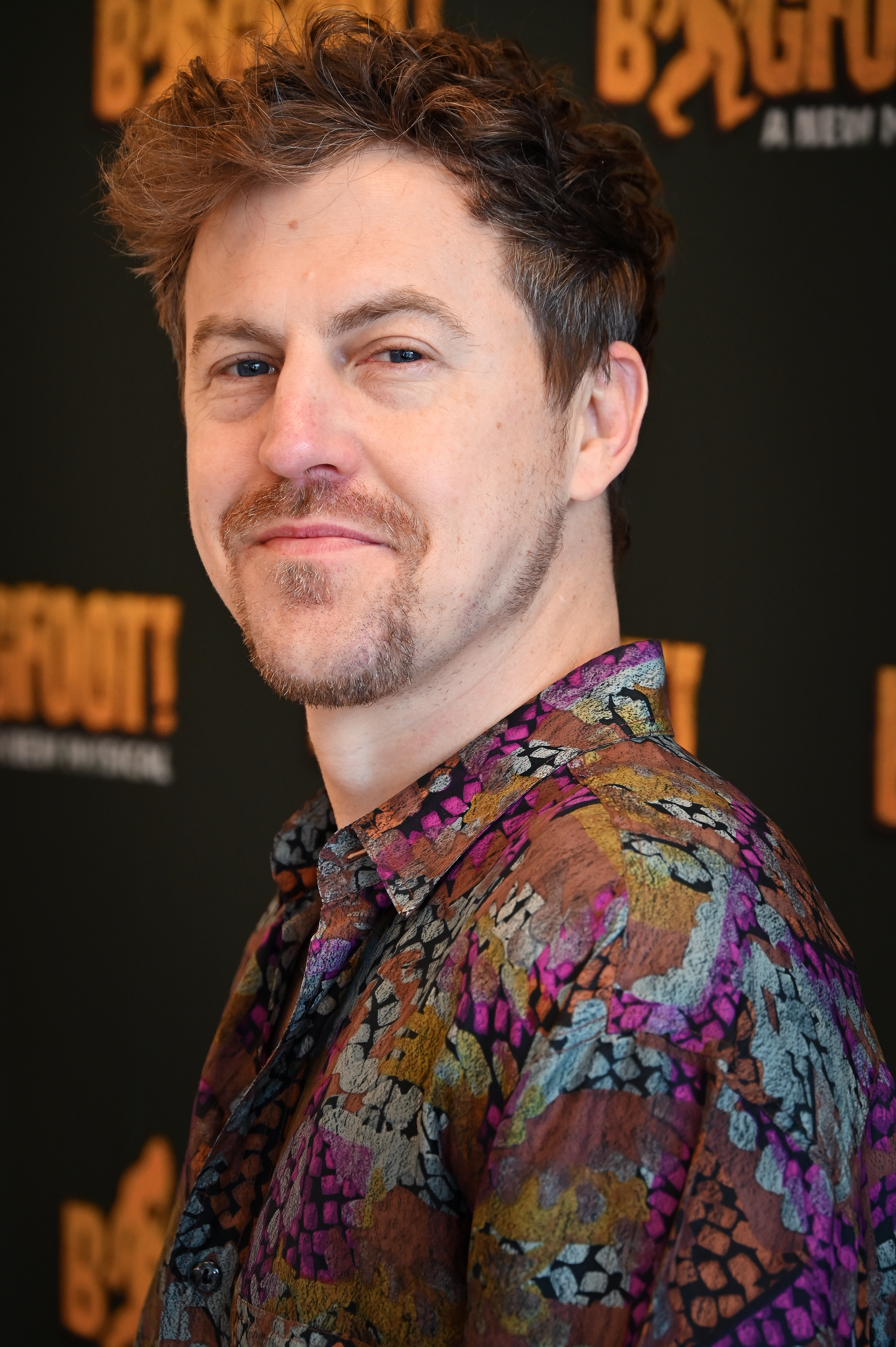
- Moffat in 2026
- Born: Alexander Everett Moffat; March 25, 1982 (age 44); Chicago, Illinois, U.S.
- Education: Denison University (BA)
- Occupations: Actor; comedian
- Years active: 2012–present
- Spouse: Caroline Rau
- Children: 2

Alexander Everett Moffat (/ˈmɒfət/; born March 25, 1982) is an American actor and comedian. He was a cast member on the NBC sketch comedy series Saturday Night Live from 2016 to 2022. In 2023, he made his Broadway debut in The Cottage.

== Early life ==
Alex Moffat was born and raised in Chicago, Illinois, and graduated from North Shore Country Day School in 2000. He attended Denison University, graduating in 2004.

== Career ==
Moffat started his comedy career as a Chicago-based improviser and featured performer at The Second City, ImprovOlympic, Annoyance Theatre, and Zanies Comedy Club. In 2015, Moffat co-starred alongside John Ashton in the indie-drama Uncle John, and in 2016, he joined the cast of Saturday Night Live.

=== Saturday Night Live ===
Moffat made his debut on Saturday Night Live on the October 1, 2016 season 42 episode alongside Mikey Day and Melissa Villaseñor. After auditioning to join the cast the previous three seasons, he eventually was hired as part of a showcase at iO Theater in Chicago. His screen test included impressions of Chris Hemsworth and Joe Biden.

He became a repertory cast member in 2018, beginning with season 44. On the December 19, 2020 episode, Moffat appeared in the cold open playing President-elect Joe Biden, taking over the role from Jim Carrey. He left the show at the end of season 47 in 2022, following six years as a cast member.

He made cameo appearances in the Saturday Night Live 50th Anniversary Special in February 2025 and reprised his role of Eric Trump in the pre-taped sketch "The White Potus" in April 2025.

==== Celebrity impressions on Saturday Night Live ====
- Casey Affleck
- David Beckham
- Joe Biden
- Richard Branson
- Billy Bush
- Tucker Carlson
- Anderson Cooper
- Bill Cowher
- Willem Dafoe
- Mark Davis
- Steve Doocy
- Ross Duffer
- Al Franken
- Hugh Grant
- Kelsey Grammer
- Chuck Grassley
- Tom Green
- Kit Harington
- Chris Harrison
- Chris Hemsworth
- Phil Jackson
- Ernie Johnson Jr.
- Egils Levits
- Arie Luyendyk Jr.
- Paul Manafort
- Marc Maron
- Conor McGregor
- Gavin Newsom
- Beto O'Rourke
- Enrique Peña Nieto
- Joe Scarborough
- Adam Schiff
- Chuck Schumer
- Brady Skjei
- Eric Trump
- Prince William
- Glenn Youngkin
- Geoff Zakarian
- Mark Zuckerberg

==== Recurring characters on Saturday Night Live ====
- The Guy Who Just Bought a Boat, a preppy snob who gives dating advice and makes offhand comments about how horrible his sexual prowess is (according to the season 43 episode hosted by Ryan Gosling, he has a cousin (played by Gosling) known as The Guy who Just Joined Soho House, who acts similar to him, and in season 45, Ryan Reynolds played his frat brother, The Guy Who Knows the Owner, in a cameo appearance).
- Terry Fink, a film critic who gives whimsical reviews on films during the Weekend Update segment, and in one episode, gave reviews for films nominated for Academy Awards, where he claimed to have watched every film from 2022 in two days, stating "All thanks to a little multivitamin I take called LSD".

== Personal life ==
Moffat is married to Caroline Rau; they have a daughter. He lives in Brooklyn.

== Filmography ==
=== Film ===
Year	Title	Role	Notes
2015	Uncle John	Ben	Nominated – Best Actor – Midwest Independent Film Festival (2015)
2017	Rachel	Ben	Short film
2018	Ralph Breaks the Internet	Jimmy (voice)	
2019	Someone Great	Will	
2020	The Opening Act	Chris Palmer	
2020	Holidate	Peter	
2021	Dating and New York	Trent Wilkinson	
2021	Clifford the Big Red Dog	Albert	
2022	Christmas with the Campbells	Shawn Campbell	
2022	Susie Searches	Hayden Powers	
2023	80 for Brady	Nat	
2025	Kinda Pregnant	Rawn	
2025	Summer of 69	DJ Don	
2026	Mermaid	Dr. Albow	
TBA	Love on Tap	Samuel	Post-production
TBA	Untitled Stephen Merchant film	TBA	Filming

=== Television ===
Year	Title	Role	Notes
2013	The State of Us	Henchman	
2016–2022	Saturday Night Live	Various	121 episodes
2017	Saturday Night Live Weekend Update Thursday	Eric Trump/Conor McGregor	2 episodes
2018	Billions	Anthony Radaelli	Episode: "Kompenso"
2020	F Is for Family	Sandy Calabasas (voice)	4 episodes
2022	Home Economics	Dennis	Episode: "Wedding Bouquet, $125"
2023	The Bear	Josh	4 episodes
2024	Bad Monkey	Evan Shook	8 episodes
2025	SNL50: The Homecoming Concert	Himself	Television special
2025	Saturday Night Live 50th Anniversary Special	Stabber	Television special
2026	Hacks	Graham Sweeney	Episode: "Quik Scribbl"
2026	Last Week Tonight with John Oliver	Cameo	Episode: "Structured Settlements"

=== Theatre ===
Year	Title	Role	Venue	Notes
2023	The Cottage	Clarke	Helen Hayes Theatre	Broadway
2023	Gutenberg! The Musical!	Producer	James Earl Jones Theatre	Broadway cameo
2024	The Big Gay Jamboree	Keith	Orpheum Theatre	Off-Broadway
2024–2026	Bigfoot! The Musical	Mayor	54 Below	Concert staging
2024–2026	Bigfoot! The Musical	Mayor	Manhattan Theatre Club	Off-Broadway premiere

=== Podcasts ===
Year	Title	Role	Notes
2020	Heads Will Roll (Audible Original - Audio Comedy)	Odin	10 episodes
2026	Judge Travis	Tony DelaCroix/ Bobby Joel	2 episodes
