= Christmas with the Campbells =

2022 romantic comedy film

- Film poster
- Directed by: Clare Niederpruem
- Written by: Barbara Kymlicka; Dan Lagana; Vince Vaughn
- Produced by: Vince Vaughn; Peter Billingsley; Eric Scott Woods; Barbara Kymlicka; Stan Spry
- Starring: Brittany Snow; Justin Long; Alex Moffat
- Cinematography: Kristoffer Carrillo
- Edited by: Simon Davidson
- Music by: Tommy Fields
- Production companies: Wild West Picture Show Productions; Cartel Pictures; The Cartel
- Distributed by: AMC+
- Release date: December 2, 2022 (United States)
- Running time: 88 minutes
- Country: United States
- Language: English

Christmas with the Campbells is a 2022 American romantic comedy film directed by Clare Niederpruem and written by Barbara Kymlicka, Dan Lagana and Vince Vaughn. The film stars Brittany Snow, Justin Long and Alex Moffat. This film also marks the final theatrical film appearance of George Wendt prior to his death in 2025.

The plot follows Jesse (Snow) as she is suddenly dumped by her boyfriend Shawn (Moffat) before the Christmas holiday and finds herself thrown into a chaotic Christmas with her now ex-boyfriend's family while he is away. The film has been described as being a raunchy spin on a traditional holiday romantic comedy and a gentle parody or satire of said traditional films. It was released by AMC+ on December 2, 2022.

== Plot ==
Shawn and his girlfriend Jesse are visiting the Christmas light display in town when Shawn breaks up with Jesse, citing that his life plans do not match hers. He tells her that he will not be spending Christmas with his family as he has a job interview to attend in New York. Jesse is left alone, but is encouraged by Shawn's mother Liz to still travel to spend the holiday with the family without Shawn.

The next day, Jesse meets David, Shawn's cousin, who she bonds with throughout the course of the film. The family discuss the Wishing Tree, a town tradition where a giant Christmas tree hidden out in the wilderness is decorated. It is said if you find the Wishing Tree and its location is kept a secret, your wish will be granted.

Shawn later arrives at the house to surprise the Campbells. He is shocked to see Jesse as the family had not informed him that she was spending Christmas at the house. The two discuss their futures and decide to remain amicable and spend one last enjoyable holiday with the family.

David offers to drive Jesse to her nature photography shoot location in the valley. David's dog Polo runs out into the snow, so the two follow his tracks to find him. When they find him, they discover the Wishing Tree which is located in a snowy clearing and silently make their wishes.

Shawn reveals to David that he is rethinking his decision to break up with Jesse. The Campbells throw a Christmas party where Robert announces that Shawn is going to stay in town and be his partner at his accountant firm. Jesse goes to look for David but is interrupted by Shawn who kisses her and tells her he wants a future with her. David witnesses the kiss and leaves before Jesse is able to tell Shawn that she needs more time to think.

The next morning, Jesse tells Shawn that she does not see a future with him. She finds a note from David which says he will not be spending Christmas at the house after all. Jesse decides to go back to the Wishing Tree and expresses sadness that "some wishes just don't come true". She is surprised when Polo runs up to her and David follows. She explains that she did not kiss Shawn back and admits that she is falling in love with David. They both admit that their wishes they had made at the Wishing Tree were to kiss each other. They kiss and later ride snowmobiles together with Liz, Robert, Shawn and Becky.

== Cast ==
- Brittany Snow as Jesse
- Justin Long as David
- Alex Moffat as Shawn Campbell
- Julia Duffy as Liz Campbell
- George Wendt as Robert Campbell
- JoAnna Garcia Swisher as Becky
- Duane Stephens as Stuart the Butcher
- Annette Wright as Ms. Cruickshank

The film also includes appearances from Blake Thomason, Caitlyn Varner, Charla Bocchicchio, Lincoln Hoppe, and CJ Colando.

== Production ==
The film was pitched to director Clare Niederpruem by producers Vince Vaughn and Peter Billingsley with the intent to create an "R-Rated" Christmas romantic comedy, as an homage to traditional films such as those released by the Hallmark Channel, with an adult spin. The film was shot on location in Utah, United States in January 2022, and the shoot took place over 17 days. The Campbell house featured in the film is located in Kamas City, Utah, with other scenes being shot in Salt Lake City. Scenes were also shot on mountains in Utah, near Provo City, causing the cast and crew to have to use snowmobile equipment to reach the shooting location.

== Release ==
The film was released in select theatres in the United States and on AMC+ on December 2, 2022.

== Reception ==
The film received mixed reviews on release. On Rotten Tomatoes, the film has an approval rating of 37%. Metacritic gave it a rating of 56 out of 100, indicating "mixed or average reviews".

Richard Roeper of the Chicago Sun-Times wrote: "Christmas With the Campbells is like a weirdly creative holiday drink; you wouldn’t expect those ingredients to work together, but somehow, they do." Ethan Anderton for Slashfilm wrote: "This is the hilarious hidden gem of the holidays, and it's better than any of the other new releases trying to hit that Christmas sweet spot this season." Reviewing for Screen Rant, Rachel Labonte stated, "Christmas with the Campbells tries to take some big swings toward shaking up the conventional holiday movie mold, but it ultimately ends up being more of the same, just with some sticky moments. The earnestness of its cast, especially Snow, makes up for some of the other elements that are lacking."

Critics praised the combination of Vaughn's R-Rated dialogue with Niederpruem's experience working with Hallmark-style films, with one review by Matthew Jackson for The A.V. Club reading, "It’s a surprisingly thoughtful blend of earnest and silly, and Niederpruem’s confident, Hallmark-tinged direction only adds to that sense of familiar surroundings ready to be subverted." Some criticised the concept, with Roger Moore of Movie Nation describing the film as a "soft-and-squishy Christmas rom-com that tries ever-so-hard to be “edgy” when it oh-so-obviously isn’t." Randy Myers for San Jose Mercury News stated that the film "tries something different", yet criticised it as "it all amounts to a lot of naughty talk and no action."
