= Sheepdog (film) =

- Theatrical release poster
- Directed by: Steven Grayhm
- Written by: Steven Grayhm
- Produced by: Joe Newcomb; Lynn d'Angona; P. Colin Kane; Ric Smith; Steven Grayhm
- Starring: Steven Grayhm; Vondie Curtis-Hall
- Cinematography: Evans Brown
- Edited by: Brent McReynolds
- Music by: Gary Rugala; Rycky Ruke
- Production companies: Team House Studios; Truth Entertainment
- Distributed by: Allen Media Group
- Release dates: September 20, 2024 (Boston); December 17, 2025 (United States)
- Running time: 128 minutes
- Country: United States
- Language: English

Sheepdog is a 2024 American drama film directed, produced, and written by Steven Grayhm. The film's story follows a United States Army combat veteran Calvin Cole who is court ordered into treatment and into the care of a VA trauma therapist in-training, and things spiral out of control when Calvin's father-in-law and retired Vietnam Veteran steps in, having been released from prison

The film had its world premiere at the Boston Film Festival on September 20, 2024, before releasing in the United States in limited release on December 17, 2025, before a wide expansion on January 16, 2026.

== Cast ==
- Steven Grayhm as Calvin Cole, a United States Army combat veteran
- Vondie Curtis-Hall as Whitney St. Germain, Calvin's father-in-law and retired Vietnam veteran
- Virginia Madsen as Dr. Elecia Knox, a trauma therapist in-training
- Lilli Cooper as Alice St. Germain
- Dominic Fumusa as Clarence 'Coach O' O'Riordan, a Montague police officer
- Matt Dallas as Darryl Sparks
- Maggie Geha as Crystal Sparks
- Rose Mallick as Isabella 'Izzy' Cole

== Production ==
Steven Grayhm started work on the film as early as 2011. Virginia Madsen, Vondie Curtis-Hall, Lilli Cooper, Dominic Fumusa, and Matt Dallas were added to the cast in February 2023, with principal photography beginning that month, taking place at Western Massachusetts, including in Turners Falls, Montague, and Greenfield, lasting for 18 days. Grayhm decided to shoot the film here when he and Dallas had lunch together at his wife’s mother’s restaurant in Turners, and as they headed to Texas stepping out of the restaurant, he looked up and down Avenue A, in 2013.

== Release ==
The film had its world premiere at the Boston Film Festival on September 20, 2024. Allen Media Group released the film theatrically in the United States in limited release on December 17, 2025, before a wide expansion on January 16, 2026.

== Reception ==
On the review aggregator website Rotten Tomatoes, 77% of 13 critics' reviews are positive. Nagier Chambers of Big Gold Belt Media called the film "compelling and eye-opening". Jordon Searle of Loud and Clear Reviews awarded film two-and-a-half stars, praising the direction and performances, but criticized the screenplay.
