= The Cottage (play) =

Play written by Sandy Rustin

- Original language: English
- Written by: Sandy Rustin
- Subject: Period
- Genre: Comedy
- Setting: Moreton-in-Marsh, 1923

Premiere
- Date: 2013
- Place: Astoria Performing Arts Center

The Cottage is a comedic play written by American playwright Sandy Rustin. The play opened on Broadway on July 24, 2023, at the Hayes Theater after first being produced by Astoria Performing Arts Center in 2013. Set in England in 1923, the play has been described as a modern take on a Noël Coward comedy.

== Synopsis ==
The true meaning of fate, identity, and marriage are called into question as a surprising, hilarious web of secrets unravels in this ridiculous - potentially murderous - uncharacteristically feminist, 1923 British tale of sex, betrayal, and oh yes, love ... when Sylvia Van Kipness decides to expose her love affair to her husband and her lover's wife.

== Original cast and characters ==
Character	Astoria	Theatre Aspen	Engeman	Broadway
Character	2013	2014	2015	2023
Sylvia Van Kipness	Amy Rutberg	Nancy Anderson	Rachel Pickup	Laura Bell Bundy
Marjorie	Maria Couch	Michele Ragusa	Christiane Noll	Lilli Cooper
Beau	Jason Loughlin	Spencer Plachy	Henry Clarke	Eric McCormack
Richard	Daniel Bielinski	Michael Kostroff	Brian Sgambati	Nehal Joshi
Clarke	Kevin Isola	Mark Price	James LaVerdiere	Alex Moffat
Deirdre	Hanley Smith	Bailey Frankenburg	Lilly Tobin	Dana Steingold

== Production history ==
The play was first staged by Astoria Performing Arts Center in 2013, with Amy Rutberg portraying Sylvia. This was followed by several professional productions including by Theatre Aspen in 2014. It was next produced at the John W. Engeman Theater in Northport, New York in 2015. A 2017 production was held at the Barter Theatre. In 2019, it was produced by Florida Studio Theatre in Sarasota, Florida.

The play opened on Broadway at the Helen Hayes Theatre on July 24, 2023, after beginning previews on July 7. The Broadway production was directed by Jason Alexander and closed October 29, 2023. The set design was by Paul Tate dePoo III with costumes by Sydney Maresca.
