= Joshua (1976 film) =

1976 film

- Theatrical release poster
- Directed by: Larry G. Spangler
- Written by: Fred Williamson
- Produced by: Executive producer: Lee B. Winkler; Producer: Larry G. Spangler
- Starring: Fred Williamson; Cal Bartlett
- Cinematography: Robert Hopkins
- Edited by: James E. Nownes
- Music by: Mike Irwin
- Distributed by: Lone Star
- Release date: December 1976
- Running time: 90 minutes
- Country: United States
- Language: English

Joshua is a 1976 American Western film directed by Larry G. Spangler.

The film is also known as Black Rider, Joshua the Black Rider, or Revenge.

== Plot ==
A black soldier returns from fighting for the Union in the Civil War only to find out that his mother has been murdered by a gang of white thugs. He becomes a bounty hunter, determined to track down and kill the men who killed his mother.

== Cast ==
- Fred Williamson as Joshua
- Cal Bartlett as Jed
- Brenda Venus as Sam's Wife
- Isela Vega as Mexican Woman
- Bud Stout as Rex
- Henry Hendrick as Sam
- Ralph Willingham as Weasle
- Kathryn Jackson as Martha, Josh's Mom

== Filming locations ==
- Monument Valley, Utah
- La Sal National Forest
- Colorado River
- Arches National Park
- Valley of the Gods

== Critical reception ==
According to film critic Ian Jane, "If you're a Williamson fan, you'll enjoy the film as he basically carries it and does a pretty decent job as the steely eyed man of few words. The film makes great use of its locations and is well photographed - the widescreen compositions are frequently impressive, and the movie zips along at a good pace, but it's not the most original western ever made in terms of story or character development. That said, there's enough action and intrigue here to keep most fans happy and, as mentioned, Williamson makes the most of his leading man status in this picture. Brenda Venus is also pretty captivating here, the camera loves her and you can't really blame it. She's alluring enough that you can certainly understand Sam's desire to get her back. If not a classic, Joshua is still a pretty worthwhile watch, particularly if you're a Williamson fan."
