= Bill's Gun Shop =

- Directed by: Dean Hyers
- Written by: Dean Hyers; Rob Nilsson
- Produced by: Ann Luster; Michael Tabor
- Starring: Scott Cooper; John Ashton
- Cinematography: Mickey Freeman
- Edited by: Eric Goldstein; Lee Percy
- Music by: Chan Poling; Peter Himmelman
- Production company: Dangerous Films
- Release date: 14 April 2001 (Minneapolis–Saint Paul International Film Festival)
- Running time: 92 minutes
- Country: United States
- Language: English

Bill's Gun Shop is a 2001 American drama film directed by Dean Hyers, starring Scott Cooper and John Ashton.

== Cast ==
- Scott Cooper as Dillion McCarthy
- John Ashton as Bill Voight
- Tom Bower as Tom
- James Keane as Delbert
- Victor Rivers as Rick
- Carolyn Hauck as Marla Voight
- Sage Galesi as Arnie Broch
- Jacy King as Hillary
- Jesse Abbott as Hassan
- Rith Afton as Susan McCarthy
- M. Cochise Anderson as Shonto Carver
- James Craven as Roy
- Santino Craven as Andel
- Denise Du Maurier as Grandma McCarthy
- Michelle Francois as Patricia McCarthy
- Lolita Lesheim as Wanda Gomez
- Sheila Miles as Diner Waitress

== Release ==
The film premiered at the Minneapolis–Saint Paul International Film Festival on 14 April 2001.

== Reception ==
Colin Covert of the Star Tribune rated the film 3.5 stars out of 4 and wrote that the film "combines solid technique, knuckle-biting suspense and sharply etched human relationships."

Dennis Harvey of Variety wrote, "Never convincing, drama delivers heavy-handed ironies along with alternately witty/hackneyed dialogue, plus too much in-joke cineaste referencing."

Eric D. Snider of DVD Talk rated the film 1 star out of 5 and wrote, "Bill's Gun Shop is a truly bad movie that has, somewhere deep beneath its odd subplots and sidetracks, a reasonably good idea."

Justin-Nicholas Toyama of Home Media Retailing wrote, "Underdeveloped character relationships discredit a cogent, though thin plot. The romantic interest is grossly underplayed and superfluous."
