= Brenda Venus =

American model, writer, actress

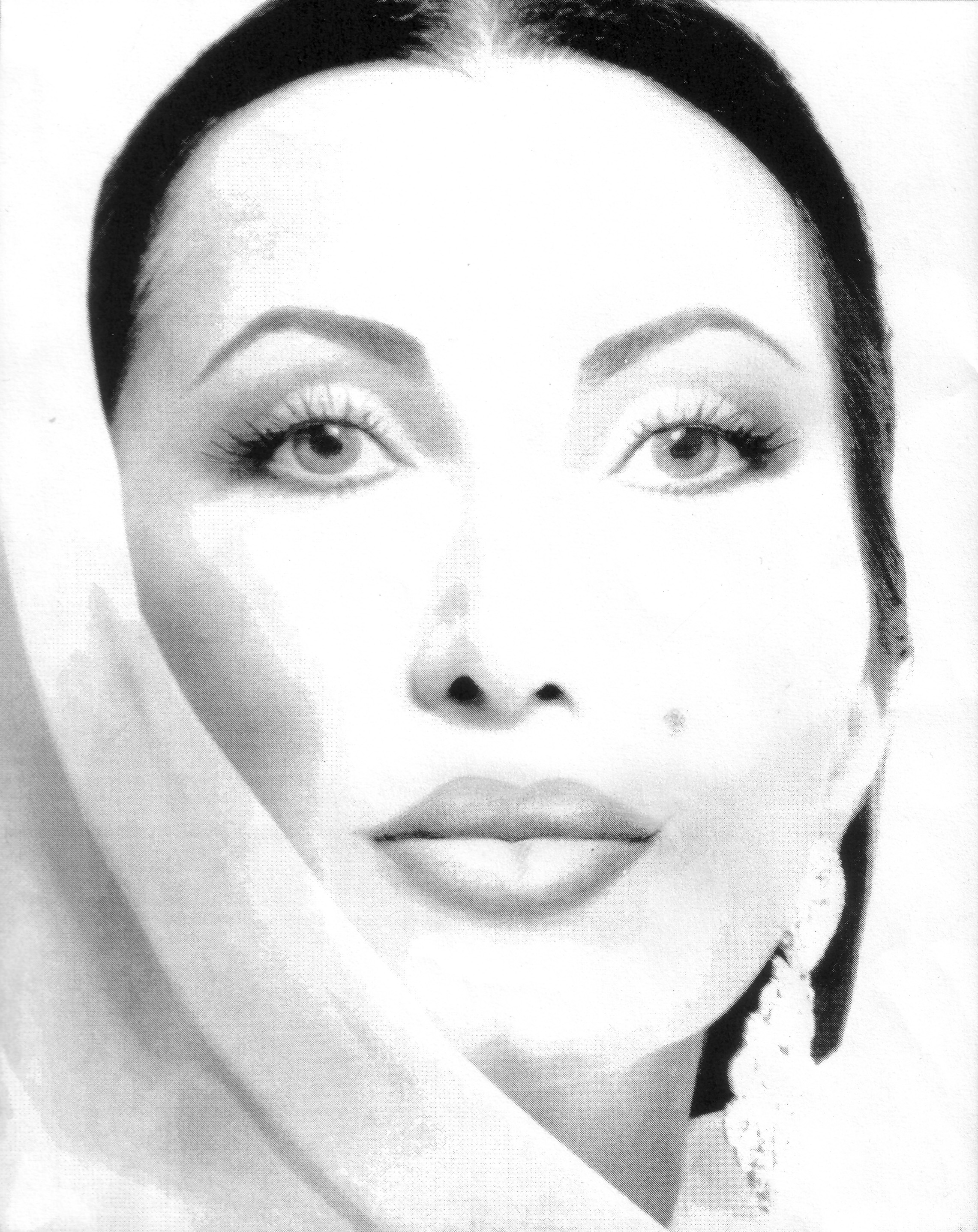
- Portrait of Brenda Venus in the 80s
- Born: November 10, 1947 (age 78); Biloxi, Mississippi, US
- Other name: Brenda Gabrielle Venus
- Occupations: model, writer, actress, filmmaker
- Years active: 1967–2010

Brenda Venus is an American model, writer, actress, and filmmaker.

== Early life ==
Brenda Gabrielle Venus was born on November 10, 1947, in Biloxi, Mississippi. Venus is of Spanish descent and Sicilian ancestry.

== Literary career ==
Venus is the author of Secrets of Seduction and Secrets of Seduction for Women and a 2012 novella titled "Twelve Hours". Her books have been translated into 37 languages. Publishers William Morrow and E.P. Dutton sent her on a worldwide publicity tour making various appearances on TV, radio and press interviews. For over six years, starting in 1998, Venus wrote a popular column for Playboy magazine called "Centerfolds on Sex." She also produced, directed, shot and narrated the documentary film Love and Sex in LA with seven Playboy Centerfolds and up-coming actors in LA.

== Relationship with Henry Miller ==
When Venus was a college student, she purchased at auction a book that contained an envelope with the address of writer Henry Miller. Venus wrote to Miller and they became pen pals. Eventually Miller became her mentor and Brenda his muse. Miller wrote 1,500 letters that were collected into the 1986 book Dear, Dear Brenda – The Love Letters of Henry Miller to Brenda Venus.

Miller's long-time friend and confidant, fellow novelist and poet Lawrence Durrell wrote in the introduction to Miller's book Dear, Dear Brenda that: "The role of Brenda Venus will keep its interest and importance also as a memorial of his last great attachment--an Ariel to his Prospero... She enabled him to dominate his infirmities and to experience all the Joys of Paradise."

According to writer Ed Millis, "Venus was a source of inspiration to the aging and ailing Miller. Brenda was 24 years of age, Henry was 84. She was a beautiful Southern belle, "The Boticelli of Mississippi"—he called her. Henry, the renegade intellectual, the writer, had taken millions of us to the sexy Tropic of Cancer and Capricorn. Now he was sick and slowly recuperating. He needed a lift in spirits... Brenda the Muse breathed life into her mortal charge and gave him reason to live. Miller gave her focus and fine tuning and wrote Venus over 1,500 letters which amounted to four-thousand hand-written pages. She responded in kind for over four years—the last four years of his life. "

== Film and TV ==
Venus appeared in the Clint Eastwood film The Eiger Sanction and several other films. She also appeared as a host/narrator in Love & Sex in LA.

Her movie appearances include:

Title	Year	Role	Notes
Night Fright	1967	Sue	
An Eye for an Eye	1973	Joanie	
Foxy Brown	1974	Jennifer	
The Eiger Sanction	1975	George	
The Legend of Valentino	1975	Constance Carr	TV movie
Against a Crooked Sky	1975	Ashkea	
Swashbuckler	1976	Bath Attendant	
Joshua	1976	Sam's Wife	
FM	1978	Dolores Deluxe	
Deathsport	1978	Adriann	
48 Hrs.	1982	Hooker	
The Avenging	1982	Juanita Quintana	(final film role)

== Russian play ==
Venus, a play about her life, featured Olympic Gold Medalist Svetlana Khorkina in the title role. The cast also included members of the Bolshoi Ballet .

== As an artistic subject ==
Brenda has been the subject of several artists besides Henry Miller, including painter Harold Frank, photographer Ken Marcus, and former boxer Gary Dobry.

== Playboy appearances ==
In the spring of 1997, Venus posed for a celebrity nude pictorial in Playboy Magazine.

She also appeared in Playboy in July 1986. According to the Playboy website:

"One of the women with whom Miller had a romantic, yet platonic, relationship was Brenda Venus. Her friendship with Miller lasted four years, until his death in 1980. In 1986, some of the hundreds of letters Miller wrote to Venus were published in the book Dear, Dear Brenda. Following the book's release, Venus posed for the July 1986 issue of Playboy."
