= James Keane (actor) =

American film and television actor

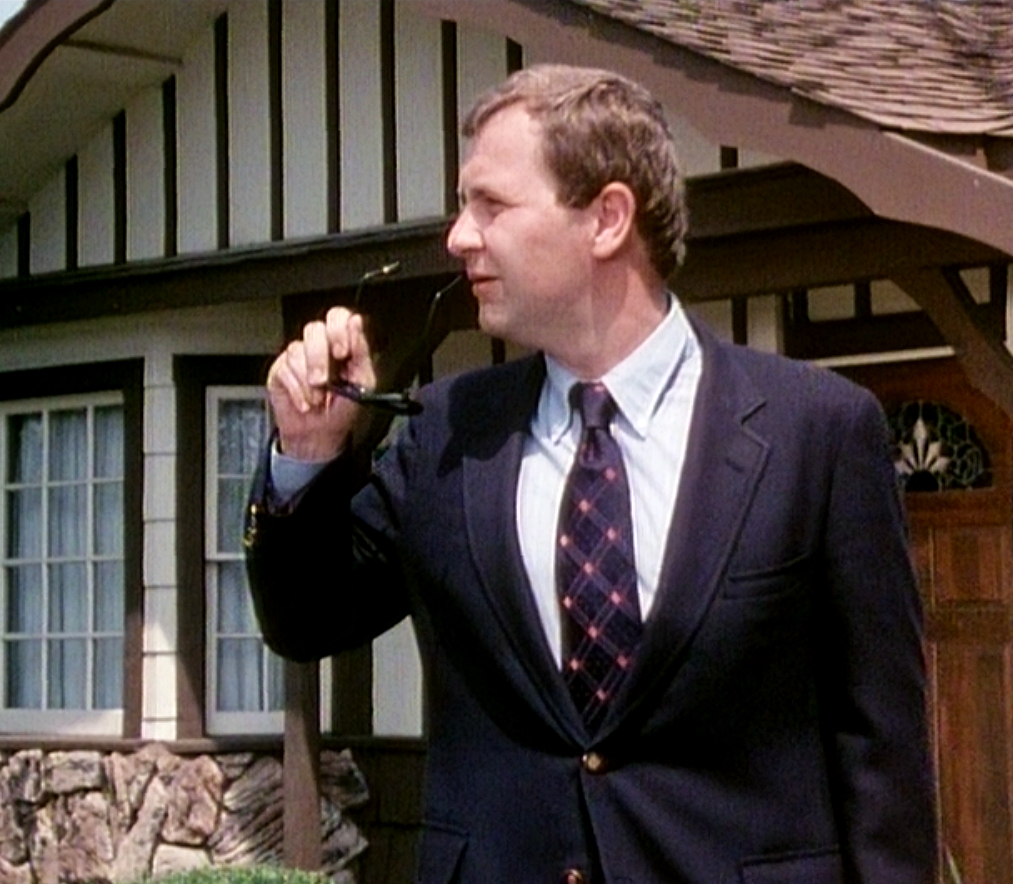
- James Keane in The Optimist
- Born: September 26, 1952 (age 73); Buffalo, New York, U.S.
- Education: American Academy of Dramatic Arts (BA)
- Occupations: Film and television actor
- Years active: 1975–present
- Known for: The Paper Chase

James Keane (born September 26, 1952) is an American film and television actor. He is known for playing the role of Willis Thomas Bell in the American drama television series The Paper Chase.

== Early life and education ==
Keane was born in Buffalo, New York. He graduated from the American Academy of Dramatic Arts.

== Career ==
Keane began his career in 1975, appearing in the film Three Days of the Condor playing a store clerk. Between acting jobs, he was an elevator operator at the Sherry-Netherland hotel in New York, where he met film director, Francis Ford Coppola. Keane thought that he might get a role in The Godfather Part II until he realized that shooting was to be in Sicily.

In 1978 Keane joined the cast of the new CBS drama television series The Paper Chase as the law student Willis Thomas Bell. He also appeared in the 1979 film Apocalypse Now, and was hired to overdub some of Marlon Brando’s lines in the television miniseries of The Godfather. Keane appeared in the 1982 film 48 Hrs. as Detective Van Zant, and the 1990 film Dick Tracy as Dick Tracy's second-in-command Pat Patton.

== Filmography ==
=== Film ===
Year	Title	Role	Notes
1975	Three Days of the Condor	Store Clerk	
1977	Close Encounters of the Third Kind	Radio Telescope Team	
1978	Zero to Sixty	Girlie Bar Bartender	
1978	Uncle Joe Shannon	Jeels	
1979	Love and Bullets	Doctor	
1979	Apocalypse Now	Kilgore's Gunner	
1979	The Rose	Dealer	
1980	Brubaker	Pinky	
1982	Cannery Row	Eddie	
1982	48 Hrs.	Vanzant	
1983	10 to Midnight	Jerry	
1984	Buckaroo Banzai	Duck Hunter Bubba	
1986	Let's Get Harry	Al King	
1989	New York Stories	Jimmy	
1990	Dick Tracy	Pat Patton	
1991	Talent for the Game	Ray Coffey	
1991	The Last Boy Scout	Garage Patrolman	
1993	Falling Down	Detective Keene	
1993	Coneheads	Harv	
1995	Murder in the First	Alcatraz Guard	
1995	One Night Stand	Single Jim at Bar	
1995	Angus	Coach	
1996	Phenomenon	Pete the Cop	
1997	Journey Beneath the Sea	Rick	
1997	The Fanatics	Veteran Cop	
1998	Bulworth	American Politics Director	
1998	Todd McFarlane's Spawn 2	Sam Burke	
1998	Pleasantville	Police Chief Dan	
1999	Todd McFarlane's Spawn 3: The Ultimate Battle	Sam Burke	
2001	Bill's Gun Shop	Delbert	
2002	Don't Let Go	Wes	
2002	Hey Arnold!: The Movie	Marty Green / Riot Cop	
2002	Assassination Tango	Whitey	
2003	The Low Budget Time Machine	Professor Staplejoy	
2003	Seabiscuit	Car Customer	
2005	Silent Partner	Senator Banner	
2008	The Grift	Lost Traveler	
2009	For Sale by Owner	Loman	
2009	Crazy Heart	Manager	
2011	Water for Elephants	Chaplain	
2014	Miss Meadows	Father Peter	
2016	Rules Don't Apply	Tom	
2024	Megalopolis	Laughing Man	

=== Television ===
Year	Title	Role	Notes
1977	Intimate Strangers	Rusty Fenton	Television film
1977	Sunshine Christmas	Hugh Bob	Television film
1978	Night Cries	Charlie	Television film
1978–1986	The Paper Chase	Willis Bell	58 episodes
1979	Roots: The Next Generations	Night Dispatcher	Episode: "Part III"
1979	Ike	Corporal	Episode: "Part I"
1979	M*A*S*H	Cpl. Shaw	Episode: "Mr. and Mrs. Who?"
1980	Great Performances	Mr. Ealer	Episode: "Life on the Mississippi"
1981	Hart to Hart	Carl	Episode: "Harts Under Glass"
1982	The Ambush Murders	Lambert	Television film
1982	Pray TV	Fats	Television film
1982	In Security	Rudy DeMayo	Television film
1982	St. Elsewhere	Lawyer	Episode: "Legionnaires: Part 1"
1983	The Optimist	The Father	Episode: "Kid's Stuff"
1986	Hill Street Blues	Officer James Sanders	Episode: "I Come on My Knees:
1987	What's Happening Now!!	Jake	Episode: "Opening Day"
1987, 1989	The Tracey Ullman Show	Scott Supinger / Alan	2 episodes
1988	Throb	Mark	Episode: "Only the Lonely"
1989	Mancuso, F.B.I.	Morrie	Episode: "Little Saigon"
1990, 1991	Designing Women	Wildman #1 / Loud Tourist	2 episodes
1991	Get a Life	Uncle Milt	Episode: "Chris vs. Donald"
1992	Evening Shade	Charlie	Episode: "The Perfect Birthday Party, Sort Of"
1992, 1994	Love & War	Husband / Man at Bar	2 episodes
1993	Jack's Place	Milt	Episode: "Faithful Henry"
1993, 1996	Murphy Brown	Burrito Buddy	2 episodes
1994	Diagnosis: Murder	Man	Episode: "Lily"
1994	Days of Our Lives	Flower Store Clerk	2 episodes
1995	Weird Science	Policeman	Episode: "Lucky Suit"
1995	Letter to My Killer	Ray	Television film
1995	Runway One	2nd Man	Television film
1995	ER	Workman	Episode: "Welcome Back Carter!"
1995	Here Come the Munsters	Maitre d'	Television film
1996–2000	Hey Arnold!	Various voices	14 episodes
1997	Spicy City	Lem / Flaxson	2 episodes
1997	Don King: Only in America	Reporter #3	Television film
1997–1999	Todd McFarlane's Spawn	Sam Burke / Tony Twist	17 episodes
1998	Timecop	Sheriff	Episode: "Alternate World"
2000	M.Y.O.B.	Principal Turk	Episode: "Bad Seed"
2000–2004	7th Heaven	Pete	4 episodes
2002	The West Wing	Registrar of Voters	Episode: "Hartsfield's Landing"
2002	NYPD Blue	Noel Thomas	Episode: "Guns & Hoses"
2002	The Practice	Michael Hallbrenner	Episode: "Of Thee I Sing"
2003	Becker	Mr. Loman	Episode: "Spontaneous Combustion"
2005	Annie's Point	Doug Gordon	Television film
2005	Everybody Hates Chris	Boss	Episode: "Everybody Hates Sausage"
2005	Close to Home	Fred Martins	Episode: "Baseball Murder"
2006	Hidden Places	Mr. Jennings	Television film
2007	Boston Legal	Joe Gordon	Episode: "Son of the Defender"
2007	Mad Men	Night Manager	Episode: "The Wheel"
2007	Without a Trace	Dick Garver	Episode: "Run"
2008	October Road	Sully	5 episodes
2008	A Gunfighter's Pledge	Preacher	Television film
2010	CSI: Crime Scene Investigation	George Anderson	Episode: "Neverland"
2011	The Protector	Eddie	Episode: "Affairs"
2011	Love's Christmas Journey	Mr. Peters	Television film
2012	Harry's Law	Joshua	Episode: "Class War"
2013	Raising Hope	Doctor Walters	Episode: "Hi-Def"
2013, 2014	Betrayal	Lou Mrozek	2 episodes
