= Uncle John (film) =

- Theatrical release poster
- Directed by: Steven Piet
- Written by: Erik Crary; Steven Piet
- Produced by: Erik Crary
- Starring: John Ashton; Alex Moffat; Jenna Lyng; Ronnie Gene Blevins
- Cinematography: Mike Bove
- Edited by: W. T. O'Brien
- Music by: Adam Robl; Shawn Sutta
- Production company: Uncle John Productions
- Distributed by: Filmbuff
- Release dates: March 16, 2015 (SXSW); September 18, 2015 (United States)
- Running time: 114 minutes
- Country: United States
- Language: English

Uncle John is a 2015 American thriller film directed by Steven Piet, who co-wrote it with producer Erik Crary. It stars John Ashton in the title role as a respected and well-liked townsperson who murders a local bully. John must deal with a spontaneous visit by his nephew (Alex Moffat), who has brought along his love interest (Jenna Lyng), and the suspicions of the murdered man's brother (Ronnie Gene Blevins). The story blends elements of thriller, romantic comedy, and crime drama films. The film premiered at SXSW on March 16, 2015, and received a limited release from Filmbuff on September 18, 2015.

== Plot ==
John, a respected and well-liked carpenter in his small Wisconsin town, murders local town bully Dutch Miller. While disposing of the body in a bonfire, John accepts help from a friend, who becomes concerned when he notices traces of blood on John's clothes. John explains that he must have scratched himself while gathering wood. When he is alone, he sifts through the ashes to smash pieces of tooth and bone that remain.

In Chicago, John's nephew Ben becomes infatuated with a new coworker, Kate, at an advertising agency. After becoming friends, they meet for drinks at a bar. Ben describes how his uncle raised him after his mother died and father abandoned him. Although disappointed that Kate has a rule against dating co-workers, Ben accepts her help in setting up a one-night-stand at a bar. When she asks him to reciprocate the next day, they discuss what they look for in sexual partners. Kate says she likes strong men who are good with their hands, and Ben tells her that his uncle is a carpenter. Ben tries to kiss her, but she reminds him of her rule against dating coworkers; he awkwardly apologizes the next day.

As Kate and Ben grow closer, John and his friends gossip together about the town's inhabitants. Dutch is revealed to have become a born-again Christian, and as penance for his prior troublemaking, has been confessing to various people and apologizing. When his friends ask John whether Dutch had come to him about his sister, John says he has not seen Dutch in years. Dutch's brother, Danny, is also rumored to suspect his brother of having been murdered. John later runs into Danny near where Dutch's abandoned truck was found, and Danny says he has been taking note of all people who pass by for the past few days, on the belief that the killer will return to the scene of the crime. The sheriff stops by John's house to warn him that Danny has grown suspicious of several people, including John.

While discussing their favorite restaurants, Kate suggests a spontaneous road trip to visit Ben's hometown. There, they visit John, and all meet up with Danny. Danny storms off after John denies meeting with Dutch and refuses to discuss what happened between Dutch and John's sister, who apparently committed suicide when Dutch broke off their affair. That night, Ben and Kate admit their attraction to each other and make out, while John kills Danny, who has come onto his property with a pistol, gasoline, and lighter. While driving back, Kate describes her family, who she says are all crazy because of their quirks; Ben says that his uncle is normal. As John burns Danny's corpse in a bonfire, the sheriff comes by to warn him about Danny, who has gone missing but left behind a pistol in his car.

== Cast ==
- John Ashton as Uncle John
- Alex Moffat as Ben
- Jenna Lyng as Kate
- Ronnie Gene Blevins as Danny

== Production ==
Shooting took place in Chicago, Illinois, and Prairie du Sac and Lodi, Wisconsin. Piet and Crary initially performed casting themselves. They contacted Ashton and Blevins directly, and Lyng was cast after auditioning through Skype. They turned to a professional casting director afterward, who they were able to afford despite their microbudget. Shooting took 16 days, though they planned out several different shooting schedules based on how much financing they received. Piet described the themes of the film as: "Contrasting worlds that are mere miles away. Generational differences. Parental sacrifice. Gossip." Piet and Crary wanted to intertwine two different genres that they had not seen combined before: thriller and romantic comedy.

== Release ==
Uncle John premiered at SXSW on March 16, 2015. Filmbuff gave it a limited theatrical release and via video on demand on September 18, 2015.

== Reception ==
Rotten Tomatoes, a review aggregator, reports that 85% of 13 surveyed critics gave the film a positive review; the average rating is 7.8/10. Metacritic rated it 56 out of 100 based on five critics, indicating "mixed or average reviews".

Frank Scheck of The Hollywood Reporter, while praising Piet and Ashton, wrote that the film's two storylines "work reasonably well separately" but are "unnecessarily padded and don't tie together strongly". This criticism was echoed by Frank Lovece of Film Journal International and Martin Tsai of the Los Angeles Times, though Lovece wrote that there is a good film buried underneath the unnecessary scenes. Michael Phillips of the Chicago Tribune wrote that the thriller aspect is the stronger of the two plotlines, though he calls Lyng a "charismatic standout". Chuck Wilson of The Village Voice wrote that it takes too long for the storylines to converge, but the film becomes a taut thriller once they do. Neil Genzlinger of The New York Times, in making it a "NYT Critics' Pick", praised the film's ability to blend disparate storylines and called it "tantalizing, sublimely creepy stuff that keeps you guessing even after the credits roll". Marc Savlov of The Austin Chronicle wrote that it "plays like two completely different movies that have been skillfully intercut" and "confounds expectations at seemingly every turn". Rex Reed of The New York Observer called it "meticulously observed and startlingly good".
