= Doc (Fraggle Rock) =

Television character

- Fraggle Rock character
- Gerard Parkes as Doc
- First appearance: Fraggle Rock
- Last appearance: A Muppet Family Christmas
- Created by: Jim Henson
- Portrayed by: Gerard Parkes
- Voiced by: John Stephenson (Fraggle Rock: The Animated Series)

In-universe information
- Alias: Jerome Crystal
- Species: Human
- Gender: Male
- Occupation: Inventor

Jerome Crystal, better known by his nickname Doc, is a fictional character from Jim Henson's television series Fraggle Rock. He is the only major human character on the show, as well as the only character to appear in all 96 episodes of the series.

Doc is an elderly inventor and tinkerer who loves to build strange contraptions. He lives with his dog, Sprocket, in a workshop that contains a hole leading to into Fraggle Rock, the home of the Fraggles. Doc does not know about the Fraggles at the start of the series, though he later learns about their existence.

Doc was played by Irish-Canadian actor Gerard Parkes in the original series, as well as in the 1987 TV special A Muppet Family Christmas. Several other actors played variants of Doc in the international versions of Fraggle Rock. A similar character, also named Doc, appears in the reboot Fraggle Rock: Back to the Rock, played by Lilli Cooper.

== Character biography and storylines ==
Doc first appears in "Beginnings", the first episode of Fraggle Rock. The episode involves Doc discovering an old room in his house and converting it into a workshop to work on his inventions. In the same episode, the Fraggle Uncle Traveling Matt, an explorer, discovers a hole that leads into Doc's workshop, and uses it to leave Fraggle Rock and journey into "Outer Space", a.k.a. the human world. Uncle Traveling Matt regularly sends postcards to his nephew Gobo, who must venture into Doc's workshop to retrieve them.

Doc is highly enthusiastic about his work, though his inventions tend to malfunction or to work strangely. He loves his dog, Sprocket, who is highly intelligent and knows about the existence of the Fraggles. Doc does not know about the Fraggles at first, despite Sprocket's many attempts to tell him. Doc has a rivalry with his neighbor, the never-seen Ned Shimmelfinney, though he does value Ned as a friend. Halfway through the series, Doc takes a job at the Captain's Inn, an inn that opens near his home, and develops a crush on its owner, Ms. Ardath.

Doc first begins to realize the existence of the Fraggles in the episode "The River of Life". In the episode, Doc is offered $100,000 to allow engineers to use the caves underneath the workshop as a waste-disposal site. The toxic water poisons the Fraggles, and the only unaffected Fraggle, Boober, goes into Outer Space to beg Doc to cease the contamination. Although Doc is not home at the time, Boober leaves a stack of Gobo's postcards, bound together with moss, which Doc notices, and realizes that something may be living underneath his home. He cancels the contract, saving the Fraggles.

Doc finally meets Gobo and learns about the Fraggles in the penultimate episode, "The Honk of Honks". In the episode, Doc learns that his best friend, Ned Shimmelfinney, needs to move away for his health, and is devastated at the thought of losing his friend. Gobo, entering Outer Space at the time, meets Doc and comforts him. In the final episode, "Change of Address", Doc moves to the desert to be with Ned. However, the Fraggles discover a new cave in the Rock that leads right into Doc's new apartment, and they reunite with him as the series ends. It is in this episode that we learn Doc's real name, Jerome Crystal.

Doc also appears in the television special A Muppet Family Christmas, in which he rents the house of Fozzie Bear's mother to stay for Christmas with Sprocket. He appears alongside many other characters from Fraggle Rock, the Muppets, and Sesame Street. Although produced after the conclusion of Fraggle Rock, the special appears to take place before the final few episodes, as Doc still does not know about the Fraggles in it.

== Alternate versions ==
Several different actors portrayed variants of Doc in the international versions of Fraggle Rock. In the British inserts, Doc was replaced with a character named The Captain, portrayed by Fulton Mackay. The Captain is a retired sailor who lives in a lighthouse with Sprocket, the lighthouse containing the entrance to Fraggle Rock. Following Mackay's death in 1987, he was replaced with John Gordon Sinclair as P.K. (short for "Principal Keeper"), the Captain's nephew. Following Sinclair's departure, Simon O'Brien played B.J. (son of the lighthouse's owner, Bertwhistle) in the fourth and final season. In the French version of the series, the wraparound segments took place in a bakery, with Michel Robin playing a baker version of Doc. Sprocket was renamed Croquette for this version. In the German version of Fraggle Rock, Hans Helmut Dickow played Doc. The German versions of the wraparound segments were the same as the American segments, but re-filmed in German.

In the animated series, John Stephenson voiced Doc. The animated version of Doc differed from the original in that he was only seen from the neck down, recalling Nanny from Muppet Babies, another animated adaptation of a Jim Henson series.

=== Reboot ===
Doc
- Fraggle Rock: Back to the Rock character
- Lilli Cooper as Doc
- First appearance: Fraggle Rock: Back to the Rock
- Portrayed by: Lilli Cooper

In-universe information
- Gender: Female
- Occupation: Grad student

Owing to Gerard Parkes's death in 2014, Doc does not appear in the 2022 reboot series, Fraggle Rock: Back to the Rock. Doc was replaced by another character also named Doc. This character differs greatly from the original Doc, being a younger woman of African-American descent. Lilli Cooper plays the character. This version is a young grad student working on her doctorate in marine ecosystems. She lives in a backhouse owned by Mrs. Shimmelfinney (the similarly unseen counterpart to Ned Shimmelfinney) and is still the owner of Sprocket.
