= Lee Percy =

American film editor

- Born: February 10, 1953 (age 72); Kalamazoo, Michigan, U.S.
- Education: Juilliard School
- Occupation: Film editor
- Years active: 1980–present

Lee Percy (born February 10, 1953) is an American film editor. At the 61st Primetime Creative Arts Emmy Awards, he received two Outstanding Single-Camera Picture Editing for a Limited Series or Movie nominations for editing the 2009 television films Taking Chance and Grey Gardens, winning for the former.

A native of Kalamazoo, Michigan, Percy initially trained to be an actor at Juilliard before switching focus to editing.

Director Kimberly Peirce stated that Percy's editing provided the constructive structuring of the film Boys Don't Cry via deciding which scenes to keep or cut, allowing her to see which would work in the final version.

Percy made his directorial debut on the short film Dreaming American.

Percy has been a Creative Adviser at the Sundance Directors Lab as well as a mentor at the IFP.

== Select filmography ==
Editor
| Year | Film | Director | Notes |
|---|---|---|---|
| 1980 | Shogun Assassin | Kenji Misumi; Robert Houston | |
| 1982 | They Call Me Bruce? | Elliott Hong | |
| 1985 | Re-Animator | Stuart Gordon | First collaboration with Stuart Gordon |
| 1986 | Troll | John Carl Buechler | |
| 1986 | From Beyond | Stuart Gordon | Second collaboration with Stuart Gordon |
| 1986 | Dolls | Stuart Gordon | Third collaboration with Stuart Gordon |
| 1987 | Slam Dance | Wayne Wang | First collaboration with Wayne Wang |
| 1988 | The Stick | Darrell Roodt | Credited as Lee Edward Percy |
| 1988 | Checking Out | David Leland | |
| 1990 | Blue Steel | Kathryn Bigelow | |
| 1990 | Reversal of Fortune | Barbet Schroeder | First collaboration with Barbet Schroeder |
| 1991 | Year of the Gun | John Frankenheimer | |
| 1992 | Single White Female | Barbet Schroeder | Second collaboration with Barbet Schroeder |
| 1994 | Corrina, Corrina | Jessie Nelson | |
| 1995 | Kiss of Death | Barbet Schroeder | Third collaboration with Barbet Schroeder |
| 1996 | Before and After | Barbet Schroeder | Fourth collaboration with Barbet Schroeder |
| 1998 | Desperate Measures | Barbet Schroeder | Fifth collaboration with Barbet Schroeder |
| 1998 | 54 | Mark Christopher | |
| 1999 | Boys Don't Cry | Kimberly Peirce | First collaboration with Kimberly Peirce |
| 2001 | The Believer | Henry Bean | First collaboration with Henry Bean |
| 2001 | Lift | DeMane Davis; Khari Streeter | |
| 2001 | The Center of the World | Wayne Wang | Second collaboration with Wayne Wang |
| 2001 | Bill's Gun Shop | Dean Hyers | |
| 2002 | Murder by Numbers | Barbet Schroeder | Sixth collaboration with Barbet Schroeder |
| 2003 | Just Another Story | GQ | |
| 2004 | Maria Full of Grace | Joshua Marston | |
| 2004 | A Home at the End of the World | Michael Mayer | |
| 2004 | A Love Song for Bobby Long | Shainee Gabel | |
| 2005 | The Ice Harvest | Harold Ramis | |
| 2007 | Wind Chill | Gregory Jacobs | |
| 2007 | Noise | Henry Bean | Second collaboration with Henry Bean |
| 2009 | Frank the Rat | James Cozza | |
| 2009 | Into Temptation | Patrick Coyle | |
| 2009 | Amelia | Mira Nair | |
| 2010 | As Good as Dead | Jonathan Mossek | |
| 2011 | Thin Ice | Jill Sprecher | |
| 2012 | Disconnect | Henry-Alex Rubin | |
| 2013 | Carrie | Kimberly Peirce | Second collaboration with Kimberly Peirce |
| 2014 | Dukhtar | Afia Nathaniel | |
| 2015 | Angelica | Mitchell Lichtenstein | |
| 2015 | Touched with Fire | Paul Dalio | |
| 2016 | Snowden | Oliver Stone | |
| 2017 | The Mountain Between Us | Hany Abu-Assad | |
| 2018 | The Kindergarten Teacher | Sara Colangelo | |
| 2018 | Mapplethorpe | Ondi Timoner | |
| 2018 | Skin | Guy Nattiv | |
| 2020 | The Half of It | Alice Wu | |
| 2021 | Charming the Hearts of Men | S.E. DeRose | |
| 2023 | The Burial | Maggie Betts | |

Editorial department
| Year | Film | Director | Role | Notes |
|---|---|---|---|---|
| 1981 | Roar | Noel Marshall | Assistant editor | |
| 1985 | Kiss of the Spider Woman | Héctor Babenco | Additional editor | |
| 1990 | Naked Tango | Leonard Schrader | Additional editor | |
| 2009 | Archie's Final Project | David Lee Miller | Consulting editor | |
| 2010 | Salt | Phillip Noyce | Additional editor | |
| 2012 | What Maisie Knew | Scott McGehee; David Siegel | Additional editor | Credited as Lee Edward Percy |
| 2016 | C Street | Peter James Iengo | Consulting editor | |
| 2021 | Italian Studies | Adam Leon | Additional editor | |
| 2021 | Charming the Hearts of Men | S.E. DeRose | Editor | |
| 2022 | Nanny | Nikyatu Jusu | Editing consultant | |

Camera and electrical department
| Year | Film | Director | Role |
|---|---|---|---|
| 1980 | Scared to Death | William Malone | Camera operator |

Thanks
| Year | Film | Director | Role |
|---|---|---|---|
| 2015 | The Witch | Robert Eggers | The director wishes to thank |
| 2015 | The Fits | Anna Rose Holmer | Special thanks |
| 2019 | The Kid | Vincent D'Onofrio | Special thanks to |
| 2020 | Juvie | George LaVoo | Special thanks |

Documentaries

Editor
| Year | Film | Director |
|---|---|---|
| 1981 | The Killing of America | Leonard Schrader; Sheldon Renan |

TV movies

Editor
| Year | Film | Director |
|---|---|---|
| 1994 | Against the Wall | John Frankenheimer |
| 2005 | Mrs. Harris | Phyllis Nagy |
| 2009 | Taking Chance | Ross Katz |
| 2009 | Grey Gardens | Michael Sucsy |

Editorial department
| Year | Film | Director | Role |
|---|---|---|---|
| 2006 | Bernard and Doris | Bob Balaban | Additional editor |
| 2009 | Into the Storm | Thaddeus O'Sullivan | Additional editor |
| 2009 | A Dog Year | George LaVoo | Additional editor |
| 2011 | Cinema Verite | Shari Springer Berman; Robert Pulcini | Additional editor |

TV series

Producer
| Year | Title | Credit | Notes |
|---|---|---|---|
| 2013 | Magic City | Supervising producer | 8 episodes |
