= Trapped in Paradise =

- Theatrical release poster
- Directed by: George Gallo
- Written by: George Gallo
- Produced by: George Gallo; Jon Davison
- Starring: Nicolas Cage; Jon Lovitz; Dana Carvey; John Ashton; Mädchen Amick; Donald Moffat; Richard Jenkins
- Cinematography: Jack N. Green
- Edited by: Terry Rawlings
- Music by: Robert Folk
- Distributed by: 20th Century Fox
- Release date: December 2, 1994
- Running time: 111 minutes
- Country: United States
- Language: English
- Box office: $8 million

Trapped in Paradise is a 1994 American Christmas-themed crime comedy film written and directed by George Gallo and starring Nicolas Cage, Jon Lovitz, and Dana Carvey. In it, three ex con brothers plan to rob a bank on Christmas Eve, but when their car crashes in the snow, they have to stay in the city they robbed until they can leave. It received extremely negative reviews on release, but it has since gained a cult following.

== Plot ==
At Christmas time, New York City convicts Dave and Alvin Firpo are paroled early and placed in the custody of their younger brother Bill, a restaurant manager. Dave and Alvin ask Bill to take them to Paradise, Pennsylvania to do a favor for a fellow inmate of theirs. Bill refuses as his brothers are not allowed out of the state; but agrees after believing himself to be linked to a robbery his brothers committed.

When they discover Paradise's bank is light on security, Bill agrees to rob the bank. The vault is locked and the president, Clifford Anderson, is on lunch. While Dave stays in the bank, Alvin and Bill charge into the restaurant and take Mr. Anderson and the restaurant patrons back to the bank. Bill and Dave gain access to the vault and soon rush out of the bank with $275,000, with Alvin driving the getaway car, but not without one of the bags triggering the vault's photoelectric sensor alarm.

While trying to get out of town, Alvin gets them lost and the snow storm increases. A passing police car spots the suspicious vehicle and spins around in pursuit and they try to evade getting caught. Because of snowpacked roads, they drive off a bridge. The police officer does not see them crash and drives past the bridge, but another car stops and offers them a ride. Due to the interstates being closed, the man takes them to his relatives. Upon arriving at the house, they find out it is the house of bank president Mr. Anderson and family. However, the relatives don't recognize them, and treat the brothers with generosity.

Vic Mazzucci, the inmate who gave Dave and Alvin the tip about the low security of the bank, gets enraged that they robbed the bank and busts out of jail. He and his henchman, Caesar, take the Firpos' mother, Edna hostage, and threaten to kill her unless they give him the stolen money.

After several failed attempts to escape and finally getting on their feet, Bill and Alvin decide to return the money to the bank while Alvin reveals to Bill he is not wanted in New York and that they scammed him. Upset, Bill leaves his two brothers, then heads off to return the money and asks strangers for a ride to Paradise. By coincidence, he winds up getting a ride with Vic and Caesar, who are holding his mother hostage in the trunk. Bill shows them his mother's picture, whereupon Vic tries to shoot him so he can get the money Bill has in the bag. Bill jumps out of the car and escapes, rescued by Dave and Alvin.

They try to get the money back into the bank but trigger the alarm. They then give the money to a church with a letter requesting to return it to the town's people. Trying to get away, inept shopkeepers Ed and Clovis (who had sold the Firpos the ski masks before the robbery) recognize them and want the money for themselves. Ed and Clovis grab the brothers and take them to the Anderson house, while followed by the police. Vic and Caesar are holding the Andersons hostage, along with Timmy (the sheriff's son), Edna and Sarah, Vic's daughter and a tenant of the family.

The police see the license plates on the car in front of the Anderson house are from a stolen car, and therefore order Vic and Caesar to come out with their hands held up. While the inmates are busy figuring out what to do, they get attacked by Timmy, who immobilizes Caesar and shoots Vic. The police rush into the house and take everyone to the office. There, FBI agent Shaddus Peyser tries to figure out what happened, and because the town's people hide what they know about Bill, Alvin, and Dave and the church pastor returns the money to the police, they release them. Bill stays in Paradise to be with Sarah, while Alvin and Dave return with their mother to New York.

== Cast ==
- Nicolas Cage as Bill Firpo
- Jon Lovitz as Dave Firpo, Bill's first older brother
- Dana Carvey as Alvin Firpo, Bill's second older brother
- John Ashton as Ed Dawson
- Madchen Amick as Sarah Collins
- Donald Moffat as Clifford Anderson
- Richard Jenkins as Agent Shaddus Peyser
- Florence Stanley as Edna 'Ma' Firpo, Bill's widowed mother
- Angela Paton as Hattie Anderson, Clifford's wife
- Vic Manni as Vic Mazzucci, Sarah's father
- Frank Pesce as Caesar Spinoza
- Sean McCann as Chief Bernie Burnell
- Paul Lazar as Deputy Timmy Burnell, Bernie's son
- John Bergantine as Clovis Minor
- Sean O'Bryan as Dick Anderson, Clifford & Hattie's son
- Richard B. Shull as Father Ritter
- Gerard Parkes as Father Gorenzel

== Reception ==
Trapped in Paradise holds a 10% approval rating on Rotten Tomatoes based on 20 reviews, and an average rating of 3.4/10. The site's consensus reads: "Loaded with talent but borderline unwatchable, Trapped in Paradise will leave viewers feeling the first part of the title and pining for the last." Audiences polled by CinemaScore gave the film an average grade of "C+" on an A+ to F scale.

The film grossed $6 million in the United States and Canada and $8 million worldwide.

=== Year-end lists ===
- 8th worst – Robert Denerstein, Rocky Mountain News
- Top 10 worst (alphabetical order, not ranked) – William Arnold, Seattle Post-Intelligencer
- Top 18 worst (alphabetically listed, not ranked) – Michael Mills, The Palm Beach Post
- Worst films (not ranked) – Jeff Simon, The Buffalo News
- Dishonorable mention – Glenn Lovell, San Jose Mercury News
- Dishonorable mention – Dan Craft, The Pantagraph

== See also ==
- List of Christmas films
