= OneVoice Movement =

Organization supporting Israel-Palestine peace

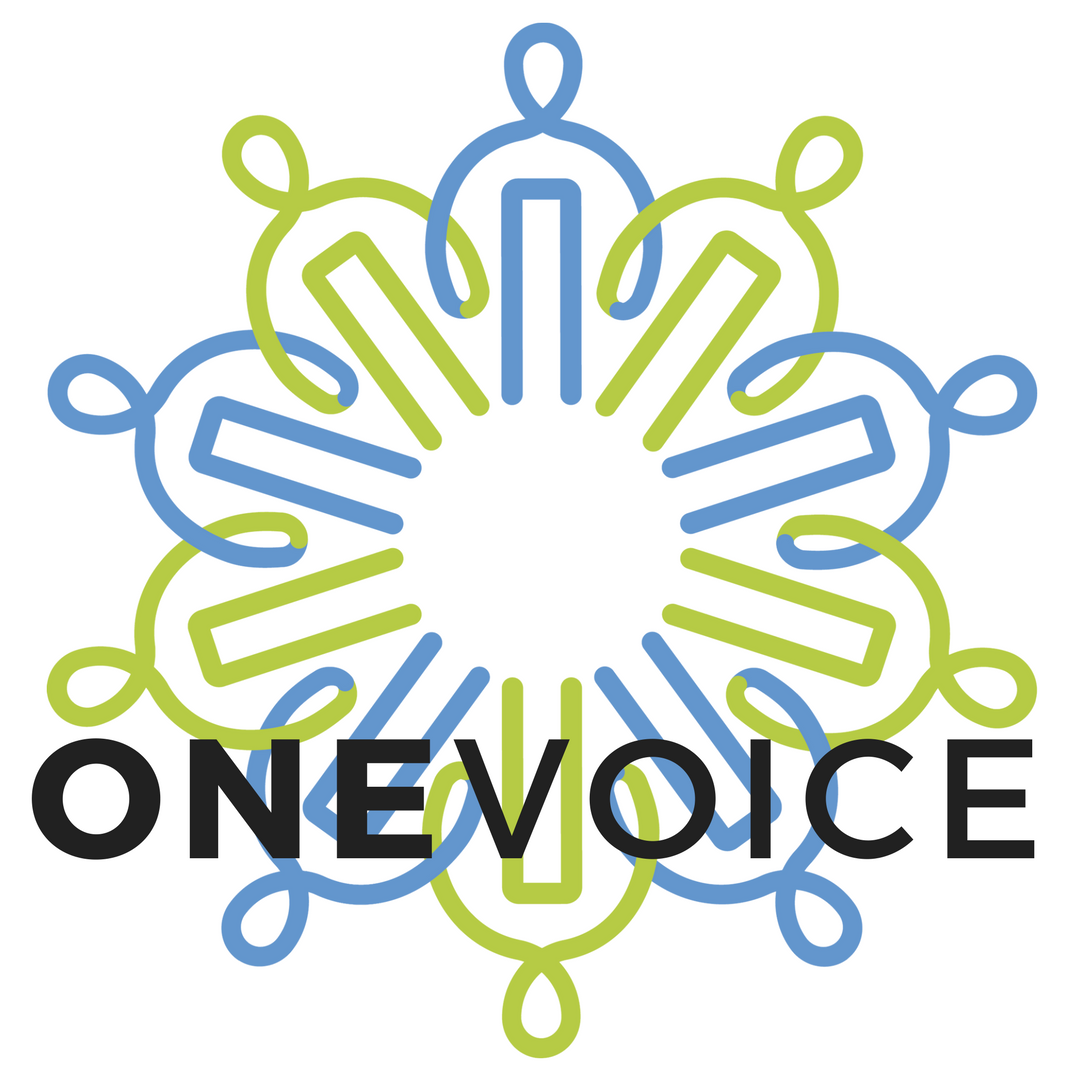
- Formation: 2002
- Type: Non-profit Organization
- Headquarters: New York, US
- Website: www.onevoicemovement.org

The OneVoice Movement was a 501c(3) non-profit organization with offices in New York City, Tel Aviv, Ramallah, and London, founded in 2002 by Daniel Lubetzky, a Mexican and American billionaire businessman and social entrepreneur who later founded KIND Healthy Snacks and Maiyet, a luxury fashion venture. It disbanded in 2025.

== Programming ==
OneVoice deployed a strategy of "parallel programming," developing separate campaigns operated out of separate Israeli and Palestinian offices to build support for a two-state solution on each side. While OneVoice's Israeli and Palestinian offices were originally part of the same organization—operating as OneVoice Israel and OneVoice Palestine, under the oversight of the New York City headquarters under Lubetzky's leadership—in 2015 they became independent organizations that OneVoice supported with funding: Darkenu, which calls itself Israel's "largest nonpartisan civil society movement," and Zimam, which calls itself "Palestine's fastest growing youth movement."

OneVoice also operated an international program in the United States and Europe, planning events largely on college campuses through an "International Education Program," and more recently, an "Emerging Leaders" program. Many of these events brought activists from the Israeli and Palestinian organizations to campus as speakers.

== History ==
OneVoice was founded by entrepreneur Daniel Lubetzky in the spring of 2002 in the wake of the failure at the 2000 Camp David Summit and renewed violence between Israelis and Palestinians. OneVoice emerged from Lubetzky's previous venture, Peaceworks, Inc., on the principle that economic cooperation between Israelis and Palestinians would result in stronger relations. Lubetzky claimed OneVoice would be a forum for moderate Israelis and Palestinians to express themselves and their desires for peace through a negotiated two-state solution.

OneVoice began as a citizen negotiations platform before embracing grassroots training and mass mobilization. Its Youth Leadership Program, established in 2004, trained Israelis and Palestinians ages 18–35 on conflict resolution, public speaking, political knowledge, and leadership development. OneVoice Israel co-founded the first caucus in the Israeli Knesset that supports ending the conflict via a two-state solution, and OneVoice Palestine supported the PLO's quest for statehood at the United Nations General Assembly through an extensive town-hall meeting program throughout the West Bank.

OneVoice initiated the establishment of the Knesset Caucus to End the Arab-Israeli conflict, which organized an historic meeting between the Knesset members and President Abbas, a visit by Palestinian legislators to the Knesset, and the February 16, 2014 visit to the Mukataa by 300 Israeli students.

In cooperation with the Palestinian and Israeli ministries of education, OneVoice launched an essay contest in classrooms throughout Israel and the West Bank. From 2,500 submissions, winning essays were chosen on their potential to inspire citizens to build a future based on two states for two peoples. OneVoice asked leading Israeli, Palestinian, and Hollywood filmmakers to select one essay as the inspiration for a 1–5 minute short film. The "Boy and Soldier]" and "Palestine International Airport" were among the winners of the contest, while "Israel & Palestine to Co-Host World Cup in 2018?" went viral.

At the end of the contest, OneVoice Israel received third prize in the Effie Awards' non-profit organizations category, and the most creative and provocative essays from "Imagine 2018" were published in Hebrew and Arabic and disseminated to dozens of top Israeli and Palestinian leaders.

OneVoice partnered with experts in public opinion polling from Israel, Palestine, and the international community to gauge public opinion as well as engage the public in crafting a consensus on the issues at the core final status issues. Using the results of the poll, OneVoice launched a series of town hall meetings across Israel and Palestine, aiming to demonstrate that there was a partner on the other side despite the recent violence.

== Disbanding ==
As of November 2024, it was unclear whether or not OneVoice remained in existence, as their website and social media accounts had not been updated since June 2023, and their main website's links to its Israeli and Palestinian "partner" organizations appeared non-functional. In 2025, OneVoice announced it was disbanding, though it would continue to operate under its original legal name, PeaceWorks Foundation. The PeaceWorks Foundation website indicates that it "promotes lasting peace for Israelis and Palestinians by engaging with the entire ecosystem of peacemaking" by "look[ing] at frameworks for real progress, identify[ing] and amplify[ing] essential efforts, and attract[ing] more funders by providing clear direction". Its only existing program is a new "Emerging Leaders" program operating on college campuses in the United States and in Washington, D.C.

== Criticism ==
OneVoice has been criticized for claiming their preferred process, peaceful negotiations toward a two-state outcome, are representative of a "silent majority", when survey data on Palestinian preferences do not reveal such a clear majority.

It has also received criticism due to their broad array of partnerships, as some authors consider their chosen partners disreputable.

== See also ==
- Israeli–Palestinian conflict
