= John Ashton (actor) =

American actor (1948–2024)

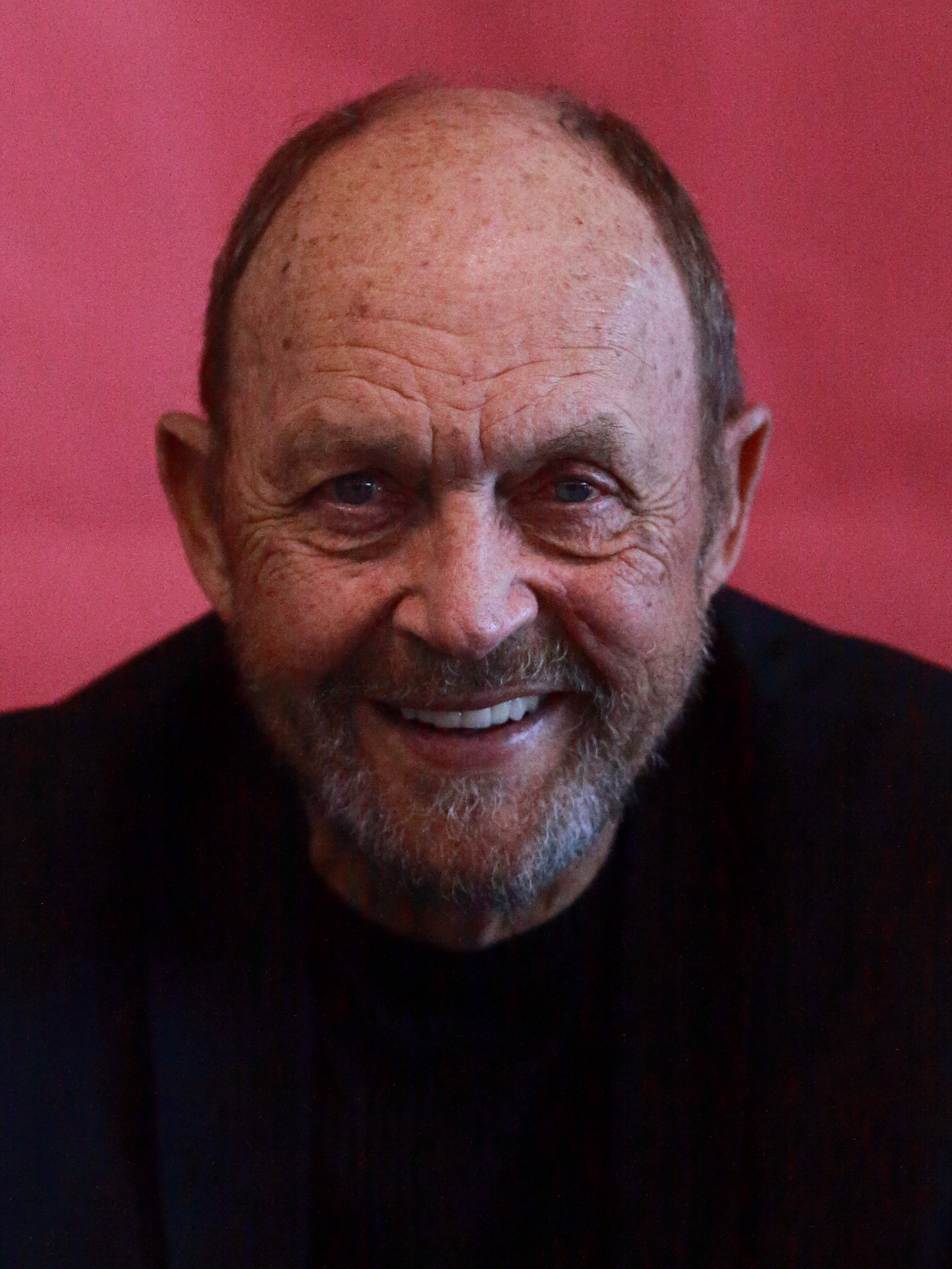
- Ashton in 2017
- Born: John David Ashton; February 22, 1948; Springfield, Massachusetts, U.S.
- Died: September 26, 2024 (aged 76); Fort Collins, Colorado, U.S.
- Occupation: Actor
- Years active: 1973–2024
- Spouses: Victoria Marie Runn (m. 1968; div. 1970) Bridget Alison Baker (m. 1976; div. 2001) Robin Hoye (m. 2002)
- Children: 2
- Website: www.johnashton.com

John David Ashton (February 22, 1948 – September 26, 2024) was an American actor, known for his roles in the Beverly Hills Cop films, Some Kind of Wonderful, and Midnight Run.

== Biography ==
Born in Springfield, Massachusetts, Ashton attended Defiance College in Ohio and was a graduate of the University of Southern California School of Theatre and Dance. He attended Enfield High School in Enfield, Connecticut.

Ashton made numerous appearances in both television and feature films. He played Willie Joe Garr on several episodes of Dallas. He appeared in an episode of Columbo, "Negative Reaction", and in episode 5 of Police Squad!, "Rendezvous at Big Gulch (Terror in the Neighborhood)".

His early film credits included roles in An Eye for an Eye (1973), Breaking Away (1979), Borderline (1980), Honky Tonk Freeway (1981), Last Resort (1986) and King Kong Lives (1986).

Ashton starred as Detective Sergeant John Taggart in the first two installments of the Beverly Hills Cop series, alongside Eddie Murphy and Judge Reinhold. He appeared as Eric Stoltz's character's father in the 1987 John Hughes-penned comedy-drama Some Kind of Wonderful, and worked with Hughes again in She's Having a Baby in 1988.

In 1988, he co-starred in the action-comedy Midnight Run as a rival bounty hunter to Robert De Niro's character. He starred in Little Big League (1994) with Luke Edwards, Trapped in Paradise (1994), The Shooter (1995), Meet the Deedles (1998), Instinct (1999), and appeared in a supporting role in the 2007 drama Gone Baby Gone directed by Ben Affleck. He played the role of Cactus Jack Slater in an episode of the 80s TV show The A-Team titled "Cup A' Joe".

Ashton stated that, given the proper arrangements, he would like to reprise his roles in the rumored Beverly Hills Cop IV and Midnight Run II productions; he ultimately appeared in 2024's Beverly Hills Cop: Axel F. He guest-starred opposite Beverly Hills Cop co-star Ronny Cox in an episode of Matthew Perry's 2011 series, Mr. Sunshine.

== Personal life and death ==
Ashton married his first wife Victoria Marie Runn in 1968; they divorced in 1970. He married his second wife Bridget Baker-Ashton in 1976; they divorced in 2001. He married his third wife, Robin Hoye, in 2002. Ashton had a daughter from his first marriage and a son from his second marriage. Ashton had three step-children from his third marriage.

On September 26, 2024, Ashton died from cancer in Fort Collins, Colorado, at the age of 76, two months after the release of Beverly Hills Cop: Axel F, which turned out to be one of his final films. Three months after his death, one of his films, Beverly Hills Cop, was inducted into Library of Congress’ National Film Registry.

== Filmography ==
=== Film ===
Year	Title	Role	Notes
1973	The Psychopath	Sgt. Matthews	AKA An Eye for an Eye; As John D. Ashton
1974	So Evil, My Sister	Brock	
1976	Cat Murkil and the Silks	Coach Larkin	
1977	Oh, God!	Police Officer	Uncredited
1979	Breaking Away	Roy (older brother of Mike)	
1980	Borderline	Border Patrol Agent Charlie Monroe	
1981	Honky Tonk Freeway	Otto Kemper	
1984	The Adventures of Buckaroo Banzai Across the 8th Dimension	Highway Patrolman	As John David Ashton
1984	Beverly Hills Cop	Sgt. John Taggart	
1984	Money Hunt: The Mystery of the Missing Link	Cash Hunt	Video short
1986	Last Resort	Phil Cocoran	
1986	King Kong Lives	Lt. Col. Archie Nevitt	
1987	Some Kind of Wonderful	Cliff Nelson	
1987	Beverly Hills Cop II	Sgt. John Taggart	
1988	She's Having a Baby	Ken	
1988	Midnight Run	Marvin Dorfler	
1989	I Want to Go Home	Harry Dempsey	
1991	Curly Sue	Frank Arnold	Uncredited
1994	Little Big League	Mac Macnally	
1994	Trapped in Paradise	Ed Dawson	
1995	In the Living Years	Mike Donahue	
1995	Hidden Assassin	Alex Reed	
1996	For Which He Stands	District Attorney	
1996	Fast Money	Lt. Diego	
1998	Meet the Deedles	Captain Douglas Pine	
1998	My Uncle Sidney	Uncle Sidney	Short
1999	Instinct	Guard Dacks	
1999	Avalanche	Kemp	AKA Escape from Alaska
2001	Bill's Gun Shop	Bill Voight	
2006	Sweet Deadly Dreams	Harry	
2007	Gone Baby Gone	Detective Nick Poole	
2009	Middle Men	Morgan	
2015	Uncle John	John	
2016	The Neighborhood	Matt Kravinsky	
2018	The Joke Thief	Joseph Rogers (Reporter)	
2019	The Last Big Save	Joseph Bird Sr.	
2019	Making a Deal with the Devil	FBI Director	
2019	My Little Baby	Sheriff Johnson	
2019	American Christmas	Rob	
2019	Once Upon a River	Smoke	
2020	Death in Texas	Asher	
2024	Beverly Hills Cop: Axel F	Chief John Taggart	
2024	All Happy Families	Roy Landry	
TBA	Hot Bath an' a Stiff Drink 2	Judge Nathan Rivers	Completed; posthumous release
TBA	Hot Bath, Stiff Drink, an' a Close Shave	Judge Nathan Rivers	Post-production; posthumous release

=== Television ===
Year	Title	Role	Notes
1974	Kojak	Cullen	Episode: "Mojo"
1974	Emergency!	Station Wagon Driver	Episode: "Gossip" Uncredited
1974	Columbo	Calvin MacGruder	Episode: "Negative Reaction"
1975	My Father's House	Sergeant	Television film
1976	Phyllis	Taxpayer	Episode: "You're Not Getting Better, Just Older"
1976	Police Story	Sgt. Paulson	Episode: "The other Side of the Badge"
1976	Barnaby Jones	Lester Shiller	Episode: "Fraternity of Thieves"
1977	Police Woman	Curt Thomas	Episode: "Once a Snitch"
1977	Wonder Woman	Nazi Henchman (uncredited)	Episode: "Formula 407"
1977	Code R	Karl	Episode: "A Federal Case"
1977	The Rhinemann Exchange	Ballentyne	Miniseries
1977	M*A*S*H	The M.P.	Episode: "Last Laugh"
1977	Starsky & Hutch	Paul H. Willits	Episode: "The Committee"
1978	The Wilds of Ten Thousand Islands	Orville	Television film
1978	Starsky & Hutch	Roy Sears	Episode: "The Groupie"
1978	Lawman Without a Gun	1st State Trooper	Television film
1978	Carter Country	Guardsman #1	Episode: "Hurricane Jasper"
1978–1979	Dallas	Willie Joe Garr	Recurring role (6 episodes)
1980–1981	Breaking Away	Roy	Episodes: "The Cutters", "La Strada"
1981	Elvis and the Beauty Queen	Jake	Television film
1982	Police Squad!	Rocky	Episode: "Rendezvous at Big Gulch (Terror in the Neighborhood)"
1985	The A-Team	Cactus Jack Slater	Episode: "Cup A' Joe"
1985	A Death in California	Detective Bob Swalwell	Miniseries
1985	The Twilight Zone	Crew Chief Brady Simmons (segment "Chameleon")	Episode: "Wordplay/Dreams for Sale/Chameleon"
1986	The Deliberate Stranger	Detective Roger Dunn	Miniseries
1986	Hardcastle and McCormick	Leonard Porter	Episode: "A Chip Off the Ol' Milt"
1986	Brothers	Agent Harris	Episode: "The Gang Who Could Shoot Straight"
1989	I Know My First Name Is Steven	Del Stayner	Miniseries
1989–1990	Hardball	Charlie Battles	Main role (18 episodes)
1990	The Tracey Ullman Show	Jimmy, neighborly doorman	Episode: "Who Is He?"
1991	Love, Lies and Murder	Carrothers	Miniseries
1991	Saturday's	George	Television film
1992	Dirty Work	Eddie	Television film
1993	The Tommyknockers	Trooper Butch Dugan	Miniseries
1996	JAG	Agent Brian Turque	Episode: "Skeleton Crew"
1997	Little Girls in Pretty Boxes	Peter Bryant	Television film
1998	The Day Lincoln Was Shot	Ulysses S. Grant	Television film
1998	King of the Hill	Instructor	Voice, episode: "Pregnant Paws"
1999	Fantasy Island	Bobby	Episode: "Heroes"
2001	Judging Amy	Dashiel Purdue	Episode: "Everybody Falls Down"
2001	Going to California	Victor	Episode: "Apocalypse Cow"
2002	Body & Soul	Jordan Meadows	Episode: "Saviors"
2003	Family	Martin	Miniseries
2005	Jane Doe: Til Death Do Us Part	Richie Parsons	Television film
2007	Reign of the Gargoyles	Commander Latham	Television film
2009	Law & Order: Special Victims Unit	Chief of Detectives	Episode: "Baggage"
2011	Fairly Legal	Lou Fisher	Episode: "Bo Me Once"
2012	The Finder	Franklin Sherman	Episode: "The Boy with the Bucket"
