= Lilli Cooper =

American actress (born 1990)

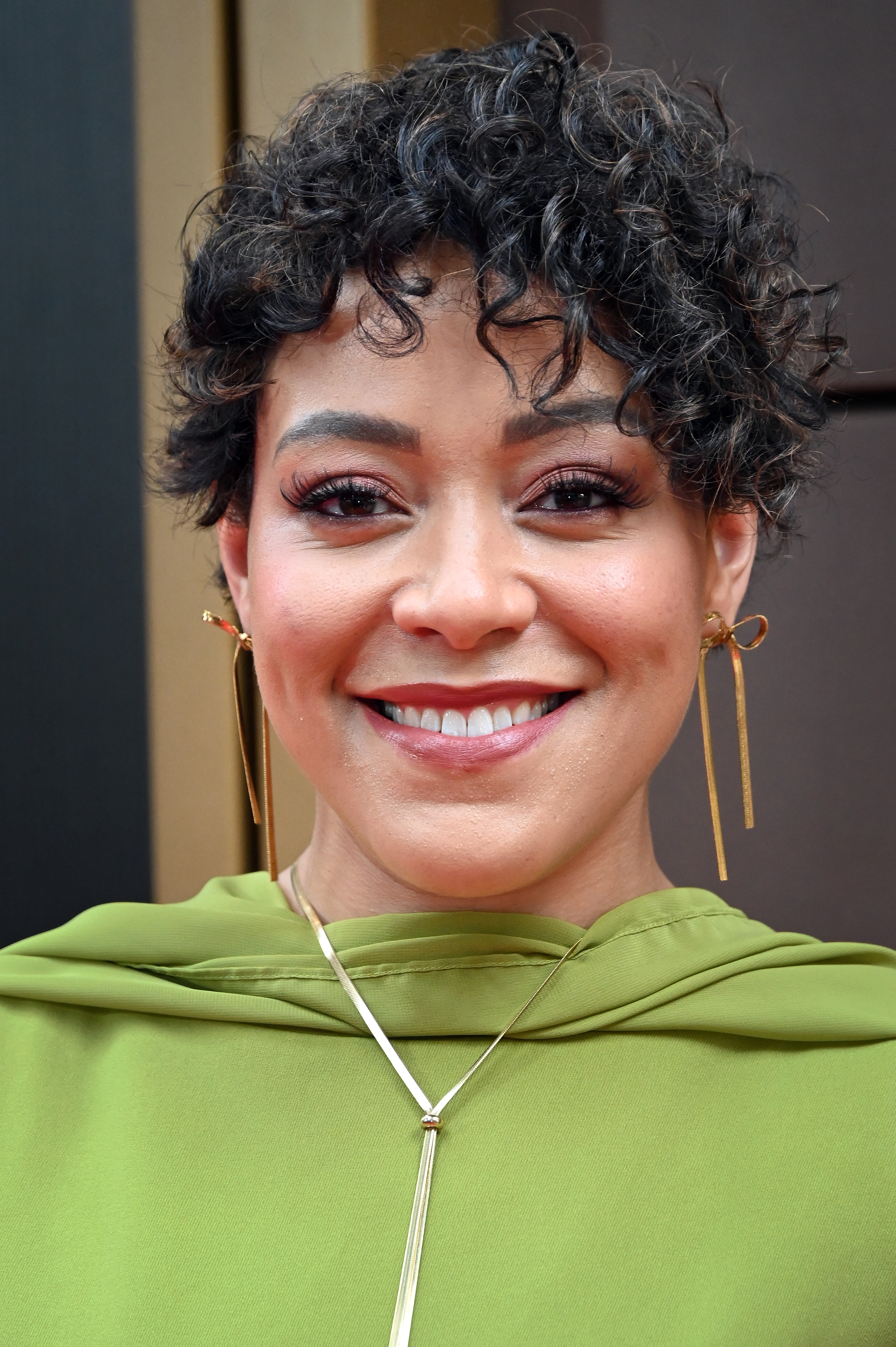
- Cooper in 2026
- Born: March 4, 1990 (age 36); New York City, U.S.
- Education: Vassar College (AB)
- Occupation: Actress
- Years active: 2006–present
- Spouse: Paul McLoughlin (divorced in 2026)
- Children: 2
- Father: Chuck Cooper
- Website: lillicooper.com

Lilli Cooper (born March 4, 1990) is an American actress and singer.

Cooper made her Broadway debut in 2006 at the age of 15, in the original cast of Spring Awakening. She continued to perform in roles on Broadway and Off-Broadway. Her performance as Julie Nichols in Tootsie earned her a Tony Award nomination for Best Featured Actress in a Musical. Her television roles have included Fraggle Rock: Back to the Rock and Hazbin Hotel.

== Life and career ==
Cooper is the daughter of actor Chuck Cooper and Tisa Farley. Her grandfather acted at the Karamu House in Cleveland. She attended LaGuardia High School of Music & Art and Performing Arts and Vassar College, graduating from the latter in 2012.

She was the standby for Elphaba in the Broadway production of Wicked, and originated the role of Martha Bessell in Spring Awakening. She also played Hélène Kuragina in the American Repertory Theatre production of Natasha, Pierre & The Great Comet of 1812 in 2015. She originated the role of Sandy Cheeks in the Broadway production of SpongeBob SquarePants, which opened on December 4, 2017. In September 2018, Cooper played Julie Nichols in the musical adaptation of the 1982 film Tootsie in its Chicago debut and reprised the role on Broadway in spring 2019, receiving a nomination for a Tony Award for Best Actress in a Featured Role in a Musical for her performance.

In 2022, she played the role of Doc on Fraggle Rock: Back to the Rock. Also in 2022, she took part in the HBO documentary film Spring Awakening: Those You've Known, which saw the 15 year reunion of the original cast of the musical.

In 2024, she served as the voice of the character Velvette in Hazbin Hotel.

Cooper lived in New York City with her husband Paul. Their first child, a son named Bodie, was born in September 2021. Their second child, a son named Desi, was born in April 2024. The couple divorced in June 2026.

== Theatre credits ==
Year	Production	Role	Notes
2006	Spring Awakening	Martha Bessell	Atlantic Theater Company • Off-Broadway
2006–08	Spring Awakening	Martha Bessell	Eugene O'Neill Theatre • Broadway
2014	The Threepenny Opera	Lucy Brown	Atlantic Theater Company • Off-Broadway
2014	Wicked	Elphaba understudy/standby	Munchkinland national tour
2014	Wicked	Elphaba standby	Regent Theatre • Australian tour
2014–15	Wicked	Elphaba standby	Gershwin Theatre • Broadway
2015–16	Natasha, Pierre & The Great Comet of 1812	Hélène Kuragina	American Repertory Theater
2016	The SpongeBob Musical	Sandy Cheeks	Oriental Theatre
2016	Tick, Tick... Boom!	Susan	Acorn Theater • Off-Broadway
2017	Sundown, Yellow Moon	Ray	Second Stage Theater (McGinn/Cazale Theater) • Off-Broadway
2017–18	SpongeBob SquarePants: The Broadway Musical	Sandy Cheeks	Palace Theatre • Broadway
2018	Tootsie	Julie Nichols	Cadillac Palace Theatre
2019–20	Tootsie	Julie Nichols	Marquis Theatre • Broadway
2020	Mack and Mabel	Lottie Ames	New York City Center • Encores!
2021	Spring Awakening	Martha Bessell	Imperial Theatre • Broadway
2022	POTUS: Or, Behind Every Great Dumbass Are Seven Women Trying to Keep Him Alive	Chris	Shubert Theatre • Broadway
2023	Oliver!	Nancy	New York City Center • Encores!
2023	The Cottage	Marjorie	Helen Hayes Theater • Broadway
2024	Titanic	Kate Murphey	New York City Center • Encores!
2024	Edge of the World	Kath	Lynn F. Angelson Theater • Off-Broadway
2025–26	The 25th Annual Putnam County Spelling Bee	Rona Lisa Peretti	New World Stages • Off-Broadway

== Filmography ==
=== Film ===
Year	Title	Role	Notes
2017	The Post	Protest Singer	
2024	Sheepdog	Alice St. Germain	
2026	The Debut	Shauna McCarthy	

=== Television ===
Year	Title	Role	Notes
2016	Bull	Claudia	Episode: "Unambiguous"
2017	Elementary	Female EMT	Episode: "Scrambled"
2018	Instinct	Marie	Episode: "Owned"
2018	The Good Fight	Receptionist	2 episodes
2019	The Code	Addison Carver	2 episodes
2020	Dynasty	Stacey	2 episodes
2020	NCIS: New Orleans	Laughton	Episode: "One of Our Own"
2022–2024	Fraggle Rock: Back to the Rock	Doc	22 episodes
2024–present	Hazbin Hotel	Velvette (voice)	9 episodes

== Accolades ==
Year	Awards	Category	Work	Result	Ref.
2019	Tony Awards	Best Actress in a Featured Role in a Musical	Tootsie	Nominated	
2024	Broadway.com Audience Awards	Favorite Featured Actress in a Play	The Cottage	Nominated	
2026	Drama Desk Awards	Outstanding Featured Performance in a Musical	The 25th Annual Putnam County Spelling Bee	Nominated	
