= The Psychopath (1973 film) =

- Directed by: Larry G. Brown
- Written by: Larry G. Brown; Walter Dallenbach
- Produced by: Larry G. Brown
- Starring: Tom Basham
- Cinematography: Jack Beckett
- Edited by: Dennis Jakob; John Williams
- Music by: Country Al Ross
- Release date: 1973
- Running time: 84 minutes
- Country: United States
- Language: English

The Psychopath, also known as An Eye for an Eye, is a 1973 horror film written by Walter Dallenbach, produced and directed by Larry G. Brown and John Ashton as one of its co-stars.

== Plot ==
Mr. Rabbey, the host of a children's television show, is every boys' and girls' favorite. But unknown to everyone, when he hears stories from the kids who watch his show about the abuse they suffer at the hands of their parents, he starts visiting the parents and murdering them. Eventually, the police begin to suspect him of the murders.

== Cast ==
- Tom Basham as Mr. Rabbey
- Gene Carlson as Burt Mitchell
- Gretchen Kanne as Carolyn
- David Carlile as Perry Forbes
- Barbara Grover as Judy Cirlin
- Lance Larsen as Harold Cirlin
- Jeff Rice as Richard
- Peter Renaday as Lt. Hayes (as Pete Renoudet)
- Jackson Bostwick as Sgt. Graham
- John Ashton as Sgt. Matthews (as John D. Ashton)
- Mary Rings as Mother in Park
- Margaret Avery as Nurse
- Sam Jarvis as Coroner
- Brenda Venus as Joanie
- Carol Ann Daniels as Mrs. D'Sicca
- Bruce Kimball as Mr. D'Sicca

== Re-release ==
In 1980, an edited version of the film was released. In this version, all of the murders were removed.

== Remake ==
A remake, Maniac 2: Mr. Robbie, was shot in 1986 by Joe Spinell and director Buddy Giovinazzo as a sequel to the former's 1980 slasher film Maniac, following a psychopathic children's television show host who murders abusive parents. The short was done to raise financing for a sequel to Maniac (ultimately unmade due to Spinell's death in 1989), and was included with the 30th anniversary edition release of Maniac.

== See also ==
- List of American films of 1973
