= Jeff Cohen (songwriter) =

American singer

- Born: January 28, 1966 (age 60)
- Origin: Brooklyn, New York, U.S.
- Occupations: Songwriter, record producer, publisher
- Years active: 1999–present
- Website: www.jeffcohenmusic.com

Jeff Cohen (born January 28, 1966) is an American songwriter, record producer, and publisher. He is also known for his role in founding the band Pancho's Lament.

== Early life and education ==
Jeff Cohen was born in Brooklyn, New York. As a child, Cohen would sing songs into a tape recorder and give the cassettes to his sisters. His musical landscape changed at the age of 13, when his mother bought him Jackson Browne’s Hold Out to take to summer camp. He graduated from Oceanside High School in Oceanside, New York, in 1984 and then attended Franklin and Marshall College in Lancaster, Pennsylvania, where he majored in government and English. During his college years, Cohen began to take guitar and songwriting more seriously. He spent the spring semester of 1987 studying at Wroxton College in England before returning to the U.S. and graduating from Franklin and Marshall in 1988.

== Career ==
=== BMI ===
Cohen started working at BMI in licensing in 1989 where he helped upcoming bands protect their music and insure they received the royalties they were due. A year later he moved to the writer-publisher relations department, working with such talent as Jeff Buckley, Ani DiFranco, Lisa Loeb, Joan Osborne, Kara Dioguardi, Spin Doctors, Blues Traveller and many more. By 1994 he was promoted to an executive directing role. After a year spent at Warner Chappell Music in 1995, he would return as senior director of BMI in 1996, where he remained until 1999.

=== Pancho's Lament ===
Jeff Cohen is also known as Pancho's Lament, which he founded to play concerts once a year on his birthday. He brought on friend and drummer Pete DeMeo as a co-member, and over the years, they have performed together on special, but rare occasions. Cohen's first big break came when he landed the theme song on the WB show Jack and Jill. The track, "Truth About Romeo", was written and recorded for the debut self-titled Pancho's Lament album, released in late-1999/early 2000. Pancho's Lament's sophomore album, Leaving Town Alive, was released in early 2003. The band did a limited unreleased pressing of a third album called Three Sides to Every Story in 2008. Pancho's fourth album, Slowly Speeding, featuring Cohen penned songs that have been performed by other artists as well as new material, was released in 2015. Cohen also co-wrote and produced an album in 2007 with Chris Barron of the Spin Doctors, called Pancho and the Kid.

=== Songwriting ===
In August 1999, Cohen started pursuing a career as a full-time songwriter, leaving his executive position at BMI after a brief but serious illness. Following the success of Jack and Jill on the WB, Jeff went on to write several songs for other shows including Dawson’s Creek, Party of Five, One Tree Hill, Desperate Housewives, Ed, Roswell, Army Wives, Reba, Smallville, The Simpsons, Saturday Night Live, Who Wants to Marry My Dad, Once and Again and others.

In 2005, Pancho's Lament wrote and performed the theme for I Married a Princess on the Lifetime Network. That same year, Macy Gray’s version of the Cohen-penned “Boom Boom” was the promotional commercial for the upcoming third season of ABC’s Desperate Housewives. Cohen also wrote the theme song featured on the TVLand show The Exes. Songs by Cohen have been featured in major and independent films such as Sisterhood of the Traveling Pants, Stuart Little 2, My Super Ex-Girlfriend, Aquamarine, Grandma's Boy, Unconditional Love, See No Evil and Two Ninas.

Cohen's songs span multiple genres. He co-wrote “Postcard From Paris” for The Band Perry’s 2010 debut album, a song that reached No. 5 on the Billboard country charts. Cohen also wrote the Top 5 hit “Crazy For This Girl” for Evan and Jaron, and the Top 15 country hit “Holy Water” for Big and Rich, which went to No. 1 on the CMT and GAC video charts. All three songs earned Cohen BMI awards.

Laura Bell Bundy recorded four of Cohen's songs on her debut album, including the hit single “Giddy On Up,” also a No. 1 video on CMT and GAC. Other artists who have recorded Cohen's songs include Sugarland, Josh Groban, Macy Gray, Nick Lachey, Marc Broussard, Bethany Joy Lenz, Spin Doctors, Mandy Moore, multi-platinum Dutch artist Ilse DeLange (top 10 hit “Beautiful Distraction”), multi-platinum Canadian artist Doc Walker (top 10 hit “Put it Into Drive”), Richie McDonald of Lonestar (title track of Dove nominated album I Turn To You), multi-platinum South Korean artist Cho Yong Pil, multi-platinum Dutch artist Waylon (top 5 hit “Hey”), Sandi Patty, Ronan Tynan, Teitur, Three Graces, Sasha and Shawna, Amie Miriello, Toby Lightman, Chelsea Lee, Ben's Brother, the multi-platinum Spanish artist Luz Casal, multi-platinum Australian artist Christine Anu, multi-platinum German artist Harmut Engler, and platinum Norwegian artist Torstein Sodal.

Cohen co-wrote seven songs on Kristian Bush's solo 2015 solo record Southern Gravity.

Jeff Cohen began working closely with many U.K. artists. He has worked British country duo The Shires, penning two BBC Radio A-List Hits for their 2016 album My Universe ("1000 Hallelujahs" and "Daddy's Little Girl") and three songs for their 2018 album Accidentally On Purpose ("Echo," "Living On A River Of Love," and "Loving You Too Long"). Other U.K. artists include Jess and The Bandits, The Wandering Hearts, Catherine McGrath, Ward Thomas, and Sarah Darling.

=== Nashville International Music ===
Jeff Cohen started a publishing company in 2012 called Silent Gate Music, which then changed to Nashville International Music in 2013. Cohen then discovered, signed and developed artist Nikhil D’Souza. Nikhil was singing Bollywood songs in India when Jeff brought him over to Nashville, LA and NYC to write songs then to London where he secured Nikhil a record deal with Warner UK.

Cohen also signed and developed Producer/Songwriter Zach Abend, who has had hits with Canadian artists such as Jess Moskaluke and Meghan Patrick along with songs by Cassadee Pope, Chris Lane, Cale Dodds, Filmore, and Ingrid Andress.

He is also credited as a co-writer on the theme song to Nickelodeon animated series PAW Patrol, written by Nashville International Music writer Scott Krippayne.

Cohen became a board member of the Nashville Songwriters Association International in 2015. As a board member, he twice successfully lobbied on behalf of the Music Modernization Act in Washington, D.C.

== Discography ==
=== Notable songwriting credits ===
Discography
| Year | Artist | Album | Song | Co-written with | Notes |
|---|---|---|---|---|---|
| 1998 | Evan and Jaron | We've Never Heard of You Either | "Andy Warhol (3:59 of Fame)" | Jaron Lowenstein | Album Cut |
| 1998 | Evan and Jaron | We've Never Heard of You Either | "How to Keep the Sky from Falling" | Jaron Lowenstein | Album Cut |
| 2000 | Evan and Jaron | Evan and Jaron | "Crazy for This Girl” | Jaron Lowenstein | Single |
| 2000 | Evan and Jaron | Evan and Jaron | "Done Hangin' on Maybe" | Jaron Lowenstein | Album Cut |
| 2003 | Teitur | Poetry & Airplanes | "Poetry & Airplanes" | Teitur Lassen | Album Cut |
| 2003 | Teitur | Poetry & Airplanes | "One and Only" | Michael Ochs, Teitur Lassen | Album Cut |
| 2003 | Teitur | Poetry & Airplanes | "Let's Go Dancing" | Teitur Lassen | Album Cut |
| 2003 | Teitur | Poetry & Airplanes | "Amanda's Dream" | Teitur Lassen | Album Cut |
| 2003 | Teitur | Poetry & Airplanes | "Shade of A Shadow" | Teitur Lassen | Album Cut |
| 2004 | Mandy Moore | The Best of Mandy Moore | "Top of the World” | Leah Haywood | Album Cut |
| 2004 | Big & Rich | Horse of a Different Color | "Holy Water" | Big Kenny, John Rich, Vicky McGehee | Single |
| 2005 | Macy Gray | Music from and Inspired by Desperate Housewives | "Boom Boom" | Kristian Ottestad | Album Cut |
| 2005 | Ronan Tynan | Ronan | "The Light Inside of You” | Cliff Goldmacher | Album Cut |
| 2005 | Spin Doctors | Nice Talking to Me | "Can't Kick the Habit" | Chris Barron, Joost Sweggers | Single |
| 2006 | Josh Groban | Awake | "In Her Eyes" | Andy Selby | Album Cut |
| 2006 | Nick Lachey | What's Left of Me | "Alone” | Kara Dioguardi, Nick Lachey | Bonus Track |
| 2006 | Sugarland | Enjoy the Ride | "April Showers" | Kristian Bush, Jennifer Nettles | Album Cut |
| 2006 | Teitur | Stay Under the Stars | "Don't Want You to Wake Up" | Teitur Lassen | Album Cut |
| 2006 | Teitur | Stay Under the Stars | "All My Mistakes" | Alex Ejsmont, Teitur Lassen | Album Cut |
| 2008 | Richie McDonald | I Turn to You | "I Turn to You" | Frank J. Myers | Single |
| 2008 | Sugarland | Love on the Inside | "Take Me As I Am” | Jennifer Nettles | Album Cut |
| 2008 | Teitur | The Singer | "The Girl I Don't Know" | Teitur Lassen | Album Cut |
| 2008 | Teitur | The Singer | "You Should Have Seen Us" | Teitur Lassen | Album Cut |
| 2008 | Toby Lightman | Let Go | "Take My Hand" | Kristian Ottestad, Toby Lightman | Album Cut |
| 2010 | The Band Perry | The Band Perry | "Postcard from Paris" | Kara DioGuardi, Kimberly Perry, Neil Perry, Reid Perry | Single |
| 2010 | Laura Bell Bundy | Achin' and Shakin' | "Giddy On Up" | Mike Shimshack | Single |
| 2010 | Tiffany Thornton | Sonny with A Chance (Soundtrack) | "Sure Feels Like Love" | Marshall Altman, Tiffany Thornton | Album Cut |
| 2011 | Marc Broussard | Marc Broussard | "Cruel" | Marc Broussard, Jamie Kenney, Robert Marvin | Single |
| 2013 | Doc Walker | Put It Into Drive | "Put It Into Drive" | Phil Barton, Ross Copperman | Single |
| 2013 | Kristian Bush | Love or Money (Single) | "Love or Money" | Kristian Bush, Matt Thiessen | Single |
| 2015 | Kristian Bush | Southern Gravity | "Make Another Memory" | Kristian Bush, Rodney Clawson | Album Cut |
| 2015 | Kristian Bush | Southern Gravity | "Flip Flops" | Kristian Bush, Paul Overstreet | Album Cut |
| 2015 | Kristian Bush | Southern Gravity | "Giving It Up" | Kristian Bush, Tom Douglas | Album Cut |
| 2015 | Kristian Bush | Southern Gravity | "Feeling Fine California" | Kristian Bush, Paul Overstreet | Album Cut |
| 2015 | Kristian Bush | Southern Gravity | "Waiting On an Angel" | Kristian Bush, Bob DiPiero | Album Cut |
| 2015 | Kristian Bush | Southern Gravity | "Walk Tall" | Kristian Bush, Bear Rinehart, Bo Rinehart | Album Cut |
| 2015 | Kristian Bush | Southern Gravity | "Sweet Love" | Kristian Bush, Sherrié Austin, Phil Barton | Album Cut |
| 2015 | Mickey Guyton | Rdio Sessions | "Forever Love" | Mickey Guyton, Ross Copperman | Album Cut |
| 2016 | The Shires | "My Universe" | "Daddy's Little Girl" | Crissie Rhodes, Victoria Banks, Livy Jeanne Richardson | Album Cut |
| 2016 | The Shires | "My Universe" | "A Thousand Hallelujahs" | Ben Earle | Album Cut |
| 2018 | Nikhil D'Souza | Simple Kind of Love (EP) | "Simple Kind of Love" | Nikhil D'Souza | Single |
| 2018 | The Shires | Accidentally On Purpose | "Echo" | Ben Earle, Jimmy Robbins | Single |
| 2018 | The Shires | Accidentally On Purpose | "River of Love" | Ben Earle, Liz Rose | Album Cut |
| 2018 | The Shires | Accidentally On Purpose | "Loving You Too Long" | Ben Earle, Forest Whitehead | Album Cut |
| 2020 | Sykamore | Pinto | "Record High" | Sykamore, Bobby Hamrick | Single |
| 2020 | ENZI | TBD | "Mad Chemistry" | ENZI | Single |
| 2021 | Jake Bugg | | "Downtown" | Jake Bugg, Jamie Hartman | Single |
| 2021 | ENZI | TBD | "Time Flies" | ENZI, Bobby Campbell | Single |

=== Other songwriting credits ===
- Hush: I Can't Be the One (Target Records) – “I Can't Be the One”
- Hanne Sorvaag: All Is Forgiven (daWorks Records) – “Bad Advice”, “Always on the Run”, “Love in Never a Mistake”
- The Canoes: Booze and Canoes (MBN) – “Steal a Little Time”
- Cho Yong Pil: Hello (Jigu Record/Pil Record) – “Need to Recharge”
- Ilse DeLange: Self Titled – “Beautiful Distraction”
- Charlotte Perrelli: The Girl (EMI Music Sweden) – “Closing Circles”
- Chelsea Lee: 18 and Alive (Atlantic Records) – “Never Called It Love”, “All I'm Looking For”
- Teitur: All My Mistakes – “The Girl I Don't Know”, “All My Mistakes”, “One and Only”, “Don't Want to Wake You Up”
- Teitur: Let the Dog Drive Home – “God, I Have So Many Things to Tell You”, “Let the Dog Drive Home”, “Waverly Place”, “Very Careless People”, “Freight Train”
- Nolwenn Leroy: One and Only (Universal France) – “One and Only”
- Tina Dico: Welcome Back Colour – “Let's Go Dancing”
- Ben's Brother: Glow (Flat Cap Records) – “Sanctuary”
- Bethany Joy Lenz: Come On Home (Producer) – “Leaving Town Alive”, “Crazy Girls”
- Luz Casal: Noches Blancas (EMI/Spain) – Noches Blancas
- Christine Anu: 45 Degrees (Mushroom/Australia) – “Don't Ya Know (It's Over)”
- Harmut Engler: Fortunate Guy (EMI/Germany) – “Save”
- Waylon: Wicked Days (Universal Holland) – “Hey”
- Timothy James: Make It Happen (Sony Germany) – “Together”
- Jasmine Rae: Listen Here – “Fixer Upper”
- Amie Miriello: I Came Around (Co-Producer – Sony/Jive) – “Beauty of Goodbye”, “Drifter”, “Hey”
- Lorenza Ponce: Soul Shifter – “Testify”
- Heather Rigdon: Self Titled – “To Have and to Hold”, “Table for Two”

=== Film and TV credits ===
- Stuart Little 2: Mandy Moore – “Top of the World”
- Sisterhood of the Traveling Pants: Alana Grace – “Black Roses Red”
- My Super Ex-Girlfriend: Teitur – “One and Only”
- Aquamarine: Teitur: “One and Only”
- The Princess Diaries: Evan & Jaron – “Crazy for this Girl” (Trailer)
- Grandma's Boy: Spin Doctors – “Can't Kick the Habit:
- Unconditional Love: Kathy Bates & Jonathan Pryce – “Beneath a Blanket of Stars”
- Two Ninas: “Truth About Romeo,” “Save”
- The Exes (TVLand): Theme Song
- Jack and Jill (WB Network): “Truth About Romeo” (Theme Song)
- I Married a Princess (Lifetime): “I Married a Princess” (Theme Song)
- Desperate Housewives (ABC): Macy Gray – “Boom Boom” (Commercial)
- Dawson's Creek (WB Network)
- One Tree Hill (CW Network)
- Party of Five (FOX)
- The Simpsons (FOX)
- Roswell (WB Network)
- Smallville (WB Network)
- Reba (WB Network)
- Joan of Arcadia (CBS)
- Ed (NBC)
- As the World Turns (CBS)
- One Life to Live (ABC)
- Saturday Night Live (NBC)
- Who Wants to Marry My Dad? (NBC)
- Once and Again (ABC)
- Committed (ABC)
- Roll the Tape (ESPN) (Theme Song)
- Out of Pocket (SEC Network) (Theme Song)
- Paw Patrol (Nickelodeon) (Theme Song)

=== Compilations ===
- Sonny With a Chance (Soundtrack): Tiffany Thornton – “Sure Feels Like Love”
- Dawson's Creek Volume 2: Evan & Jaron – “Crazy for this Girl”
- Stuart Little 2: Mandy Moore – “Top of the World”
- Sisterhood of the Traveling Pants: Alana Grace – “Black Roses Red”
- Desperate Housewives: Macy Gray – “Boom Boom”
- Now 6: Evan & Jaron – “Crazy for this Girl”
- Kidz Bop Volume 2: Evan and Jaron – “Crazy for this Girl”
- Performing Songwriters Top 12 DIY: Pancho's Lament – “Truth About Romeo”
- Aquamarine Soundtrack: Teitur – “One and Only”
