= A Life Worth Living =

A Life Worth Living may refer to:

- A Life Worth Living, autobiography of Michael Smurfit
- A Life Worth Living, book by Nicky Gumbel
- A Life Worth Living (anthology), a Bernice Summerfield anthology
- A Life Worth Living (album), 2014 by Marc Broussard
