= Perfect to Me =

Perfect to Me may refer to:

- "Perfect to Me", 2005 song by Al Green from his album Everything's OK
- "Perfect to Me", 2014 song by Marc Broussard from his album A Life Worth Living
- "Perfect to Me", 2018 song by Dave Audé

== See also ==
- "Perfect" (Anne-Marie song), a 2018 song by Anne-Marie, retitled "Perfect to Me" for its remix
