= Evan and Jaron (album) =

Studio album by Evan and Jaron
- Released: September 5, 2000
- Length: 44:39
- Label: Columbia
- Producer: Evan Lowenstein; Jaron Lowenstein; John Fields; David Tickle

Evan and Jaron chronology
We've Never Heard of You Either (1998)	Evan and Jaron (2000)	Half Dozen (2004)

Singles from Evan and Jaron
- 1. "Crazy for This Girl" Released: 2000; 2. "From My Head to My Heart" Released: 2001; 3. "The Distance" Released: 2001

Professional ratings
Review scores
Source	Rating
AllMusic	4/5 stars

Evan and Jaron is American music duo Evan and Jaron's second album, released on September 5, 2000. It contains the hit singles "Crazy for This Girl", "From My Head to My Heart" (which was previously on the soundtrack to Runaway Bride), and "The Distance" (which would later be on the Serendipity soundtrack.) "Crazy for This Girl" was the only single to chart on the US Billboard Hot 100, reaching number 15; "From My Head to My Heart" and "The Distance" appeared on the Bubbling Under Hot 100 chart.

== Track listing ==
1. "Outerspace" (Evan Lowenstein, Jaron Lowenstein) – 3:53
2. "Ready or Not" (Evan, Dan Wilson) – 3:29
3. "Crazy for This Girl" (Jaron, Jeff Cohen) – 3:22
4. "Done Hangin' on Maybe" (Jaron, Cohen) – 3:32
5. "The Distance" (Evan, Ty Lacy) – 4:25
6. "Wouldn't It Be Nice to Be Proud" (Evan, Jaron) – 4:12
7. "Pick up the Phone" (Evan, Jaron, Glen Ballard) – 3:59
8. "From My Head to My Heart" (Evan, Dave Bassett) – 3:10
9. "On the Bus" (Evan, Bassett) – 3:41
10. "You Don't Know Me" (Evan, Jaron) – 3:32
11. "Make It Better" (Evan, Jaron) – 2:58
12. "I Could Fall" (Evan, Billy Falcon) – 4:07
13. "Crazy for This Girl (Acoustic Version) (2001 Bonus Track)" – 3:19
