= Carencro (album) =

Studio album by Marc Broussard
- Released: August 3, 2004
- Studio: El Dorado Studios (Burbank, California): Scream Studios (Studio City, California)
- Genre: Blues, R&B
- Label: Island
- Producer: Marshall Altman

Marc Broussard chronology
Momentary Setback (2002)	Carencro (2004)	S.O.S.: Save Our Soul (2007)

Professional ratings
Review scores
Source	Rating
AllMusic	3.5/5 stars
Music Box	3.5/5 stars

Carencro is the major label debut of Louisiana musician Marc Broussard. The album was released by Island Records on August 3, 2004. The album title pays tribute to the musician's hometown of Carencro, Louisiana.

The album's first single, "Home", received airplay during the initial album release, and also after Hurricane Katrina. The song's music video, showing masses of people stuck in a traffic jam on the highway, seemed appropriate to depict displaced people fleeing New Orleans.

The track "Gavin's Song" was written for Broussard's son, Gavin.

== Track listing ==
1. "Home" (Marc Broussard, Shannon Sanders, Marshall Altman, Ted Broussard, and Andrew Ramsey) - 5:05
2. "Rocksteady" (Broussard, Jeff Trott, Mike Elizondo, and David Ryan Harris) - 4:05
3. "Beauty of Who You Are" (Broussard, Radney Foster, and Justin Tocket) - 4:12
4. "Save Me" (Marc Broussard and Jay Joyce) - 3:41
5. "Come Around" (Broussard and Harris) - 4:58
6. "Where You Are" (Broussard, Altman, and Angelo) - 3:54
7. "Lonely Night in Georgia" (Broussard, Dave Barnes, and Martin Sexton) - 6:21
8. "Saturday" (Marc Broussard, Ty Smith, and Ramsey) - 3:10
9. "The Wanderer" (Broussard and Altman) - 3:58
10. "Hope For Me Yet" (Broussard, Foster, Tocket) - 3:45
11. "Let Me Leave" (Broussard and Altman) - 4:31
12. "Gavin's Song" [Hidden Bonus Track] (Broussard and Barnes) - 3:12

== Personnel ==
- Marc Broussard – vocals, acoustic guitar (2, 3, 5–10)
- David Egan – organ (1)
- Jim McGorman – Wurlitzer electric piano (1, 2, 4, 5) organ (2, 5, 7, 10), backing vocals (2), acoustic piano (3, 5, 7, 10, 11), Rhodes electric piano (3, 6), Fender Rhodes (8)
- Drew Ramsey – programming (1)
- Shannon Sanders – programming (1)
- Marshall Altman – backing vocals (1–4, 6, 7), Moog synthesizer (2), toy piano (2), acoustic guitar (4), Rhodes electric piano (11), programming (11), string arrangements (11)
- Ted Broussard – acoustic guitar (1, 3, 7, 9)
- Dino Meneghin – electric guitar (1, 8), guitar soloist (1)
- Sonny Landreth – slide guitar (1)
- Julian Coryell – electric lead guitar (2), rhythm guitar (2), electric guitar (3–7, 9, 10), backing vocals (3, 7), keyboards (4, 6), banjo (6, 9), acoustic guitar (8)
- Calvin Turner – bass (1–10), trombone (5, 8), horn arrangements (5, 8)
- Joe Zook – 12-string bass (1, 10), rhythm guitar (2), electric guitar (4, 6), percussion (6), tambourine (10), bass (11)
- Chad Gilmore – drums (1–10)
- Lenny Castro – triangle (1), washboard (1), percussion (2, 4, 5, 7–9), shaker (10)
- Kevin Stevens – percussion (10)
- Bayou Bruce Steppers & Entourage – handclaps and stomps (1)
- Glen Berger – baritone saxophone (5), tenor saxophone (5, 8), flute (8)
- Lee Thornburg – trumpet (5, 8)
- The William Brothers – backing vocals (8)
- Carencro Symphony Orchestra Gospel Choir – backing vocals (9)

=== Production ===
- Diana Fragnito – A&R
- Marshall Altman – producer
- Joe Zook – recording, mixing
- Annette Cisneros – recording assistant
- Elan Trujillo – recording assistant
- Alex Uychocde – mix assistant
- Bob Ludwig – mastering at Gateway Mastering (Portland, Maine)
- Don VanCleave – A&R consultant
- Leah Simon – creative consultant
- Louis Marino – art direction, design
- Matt Lehman – additional artwork
- Alex McKinney – web design
- Bluezoom – web design
- John Chiasson – photography
- Brick Wall Management – management

== Singles ==
"Home" was the album's lead single. It was originally just sent out to pop radio stations, but it crossed over into country radio, with the video eventually being added to Country Music Television (CMT).

"Where You Are" served as the second single. The music video received substantial airplay on VH1.
