= Keep Coming Back (album) =

Studio album by Marc Broussard
- Released: September 16, 2008
- Studio: Ocean Way Recording (Nashville, Tennessee): Dockside Studio (Maurice, Louisiana)
- Genre: R&B
- Label: Atlantic
- Producer: Justin Tocket: Calvin Turner

Marc Broussard chronology
| S.O.S.: Save Our Soul (2007) | Keep Coming Back (2008) | Marc Broussard (2011) |

Professional ratings
Review scores
| Source | Rating |
|---|---|
| Allmusic | 4/5 stars |

Keep Coming Back is the fourth studio album by Marc Broussard. It is a collection of all-new material and was preceded by two iTunes exclusive EP releases ("Hard Knocks" and "When It's Good"). It debuted on the Billboard Top 200 albums chart at #136, with 4,400+ copies sold.

== Track listing ==
1. "Keep Coming Back" (Marc Broussard, Chad Gilmore, Jim McGorman) - 3:34
2. "Hard Knocks" (Broussard, Andrew Ramsey, Shannon Sanders) - 3:56
3. "Real Good Thing" (Broussard, McGorman, Ramsey, Sanders, Calvin Turner) - 3:53
4. "Why Should She Wait" [featuring Sara Bareilles] (Broussard, Gilmore, McGorman, Raphael Saadiq) - 3:32
5. "Power's in the People" (Broussard, Gilmore, Turner, Court Clement, De Marco Johnson) - 5:51
6. "Evil Things" (Broussard, Gilmore, McGorman, Marshall Altman, Ivan Neville) - 4:04
7. "When It's Good" [featuring LeAnn Rimes] (Broussard, Jon Randall) - 4:12
8. "Man for Life" (Broussard, Eric Rosse) - 4:27
9. "Another Night Alone" (Broussard, Radney Foster, Justin Tocket) - 3:54
10. "Saying I Love You" (Broussard, Foster, Tocket) - 3:49
11. "Going Home" (Broussard, Jay Joyce) - 3:42
12. "Evangeline Rose" (Untitled Bonus Track) (Broussard) - 3:07

== Personnel ==
- Marc Broussard – lead vocals, backing vocals (1–4, 8, 10), vocal choir (9)
- Tim Akers – acoustic piano (1, 7), organ (1–4, 7, 10), Wurlitzer electric piano (5), Rhodes electric piano (6, 9), Moog synthesizer (9)
- De Marco Johnson – clavinet (1, 5, 8, 10), Wurlitzer electric piano (2, 7, 8), Rhodes electric piano (4, 10, 11), acoustic piano (6, 11), synth bass (9)
- Gary Burnette – guitars (1–4, 7, 9), manditar (7)
- Courtlan Clement – guitars (1–5, 7–10)
- Adam Shoenfeld – guitars (5, 8, 10, 11)
- Dan Dugmore – dobro (7), pedal steel guitar (11)
- Calvin Turner – bass (1–5, 7, 8, 10, 11), horn arrangements and conductor (1, 5, 8), backing vocals (1), string arrangements and conductor (5, 6, 10, 11), bells (6), percussion (6), clavinet (9)
- Chad Gilmore – drums (1–5, 7–11), percussion (1, 8)
- Ken Lewis – percussion
- Jeff Coffin – saxophone (1, 8)
- Mark Douthit – saxophone (1, 8)
- Roy Agee – trombone (1, 8)
- Barry Green – trombone (1, 8)
- Reggie Gisham – trumpet (1, 5, 8)
- Mike Haynes – trumpet (1, 5, 8)
- Steve Patrick – trumpet (1, 5, 8)
- Jennifer Kummer – French horn (6)
- The Love Sponge Orchestra – strings (5, 6, 10, 11)
- David Davidson – concertmaster (5, 6, 10, 11), string contractor (5, 6, 10, 11)
- Nickie Conley – backing vocals (1, 7, 8, 10)
- Shannon Sanders – backing vocals (1, 2, 7, 8), co-lead vocals (5)
- Ashley J. Turner – backing vocals (1)
- Andrew Ramsey – backing vocals (3, 10)
- Sara Bareilles – backing vocals (4)
- Jason Eskridge – co-lead vocals (5), backing vocals (7, 8)
- LeAnn Rimes – co-lead vocals (7)

=== Production ===
- Ross DuPré – A&R
- Gregg Nadel – A&R, product management
- Calvin Turner – producer
- Justin Tocket – producer, recording, mixing
- Korey Richie – additional engineer
- Joe Martino – assistant engineer
- Andrew Mendelson – mastering at Georgetown Masters (Nashville, Tennessee)
- Rachel Rosemire – the "sheriff"
- Brian Ranney – packaging production
- Rob Gold – art management and production
- Mark Obriski – art direction
- Connie Makita – design
- Alex McKinney – web design
- Colin Lane – photography
- Kate Erwin – stylist
- Brick Wall Management – management

== Singles ==
'Hard Knocks' is the first single. It was released to iTunes as a digital single, and has since charted at #11 on Billboard's "Hot Singles Sales" chart.

'Keep Coming Back', the album's title track, was a promotional single, which Marc performed on several late night and morning talk shows.

'When It's Good' (featuring LeAnn Rimes) was sent to Country radio stations in January 2009.
