= Pray for You (Jaron and the Long Road to Love song) =

Single by Jaron and the Long Road to Love

from the album Getting Dressed in the Dark
- Released: November 30, 2009
- Genre: Country
- Length: 3:10
- Label: Jaronwood/Universal Republic/Big Machine
- Songwriters: Jaron Lowenstein; Joel Brentlinger
- Producer: Jaron Lowenstein

Jaron and the Long Road to Love singles chronology
"Pray for You" (2009)	"That's Beautiful to Me" (2010)

"Pray for You" is the debut single by American singer Jaron Lowenstein, credited as Jaron and the Long Road to Love. It was written by Lowenstein and Joel Brentlinger. The song is Lowenstein's first solo single release, following three singles as part of the duo Evan and Jaron. The song is included on his debut album, Getting Dressed in the Dark.

The song was nominated for Single by New/Breakthrough Artist at the first-annual 2010 American Country Awards.

== Content ==
In "Pray for You", the narrator is told to pray for those who have wronged him, so he prays for unfavorable events on his former lover (e.g. "I pray your brakes go out running down a hill").

Lowenstein told Technorati that the song "wasn't started or pushed by some major label or organization. I would love to take the credit for its success, but honestly this is something fans want and they are the ones calling radio to have them play it."

== Critical reception ==
The song has been met with positive reviews. Matt Bjorke of Roughstock called the lyrics "clever" and thought that it was "unique enough lyrically" to be a hit. Jim Malec of The 9513 gave it a thumbs-up, with his review saying that it "demonstrates a delightful disdain for mainstream protocol–the song is sinister, and that’s a wonderful respite among a seemingly never-ending pipeline of songs that heavy-handedly tell us how to live and what to believe." Brian Mansfield gave a positive review in USA Today. In his review Mansfield called the song "a twisted novelty that combines country's fondness for spiritual themes and relational revenge."

== Music video ==
The song has had two music videos. The first was directed by Hank Friedmann and aired on January 4, 2010. A second, issued on April 8, 2010, under the direction of Mark Klasfeld, includes a guest appearance from actress Jaime Pressly. The first music video is about a man who gets revenge on his ex-lover over a voodoo web site. The second music video is about a man who lives with this woman who abuses him in multiple ways.

== Chart performance ==
"Pray for You" debuted at number 58 on the Billboard Hot Country Songs chart for the week ending December 5, 2009, and peaked at number 13. On the chart dated for the week ending April 10, 2010, "Pray for You" entered the Billboard Hot 100 at number 87, and has since peaked at number 34, providing the singer with his second Top 40 pop hit (he achieved his first as part of Evan and Jaron).

Chart (2009–2010)	Peak position
Canada Hot 100 (Billboard)	70
US Billboard Hot 100	34
US Hot Country Songs (Billboard)	13
