= Marc Broussard (album) =

Studio album by Marc Broussard
- Released: June 14, 2011
- Studio: Dockside Studio and Lewis Park Studios (Maurice, Louisiana): Garage Rock Studio (Franklin, Tennessee); Superphonic, Little Big Sound and Myspace Studios (Nashville, Tennessee)
- Genre: R&B, pop, rock
- Label: Atlantic
- Producer: Jamie Kenney

Marc Broussard chronology
Keep Coming Back (2008)	Marc Broussard (2011)	A Life Worth Living (2014)

Professional ratings
Review scores
Source	Rating
Allmusic	2/5 stars

Marc Broussard is the fifth studio album by Marc Broussard.

It is a collection of all-new material and was preceded by a digital EP release ("Marc Broussard EP"). It was released on June 14, 2011, with a deluxe edition available on iTunes and Amazon MP3. It includes the two lead singles "Lucky" and "Only Everything."

== Track listing ==
1. "Lucky" (Marc Broussard, Jamie Kenney) - 3:29
2. "Only Everything" (Broussard, Kenney, Ben Glover) - 3:45
3. "Cruel" (Broussard, Kenney, Jeff Cohen, Robert Marvin) - 3:50
4. "Yes Man" (Broussard, Kenney) - 5:02
5. "Let It All Out" (Broussard, Kenney) - 3:41
6. "Emily" (Broussard, Kenney, Glover) - 3:27
7. "Our Big Mistake" (Broussard, Kenney) - 4:18
8. "Bleeding Heart" (Broussard, Kenney) - 4:00
9. "Eye On The Prize" (Broussard, Kenney, Court Clement, Chad Gilmore, De Marco Johnson, Calvin Turner) - 4:22
10. "Let Me Do It Over / Gibby's Song" (Hidden Bonus Track) (Broussard, Kenney) - 7:28

=== Deluxe edition bonus tracks ===
1. "Could You Believe"
2. "Stay With Me"
3. "Let Me Do It Over" (Demo)

== Personnel ==
- Marc Broussard – lead vocals, backing vocals (2–5, 7)
- Jamie Kenney – keyboards, acoustic piano, Fender Rhodes, Wurlitzer electric piano, synthesizers, Hammond B3 organ, Mellotron, programming, percussion, glockenspiel, vibraphone, backing vocals, brass arrangements (1, 4), string arrangements (1, 5, 7)
- Robert Marvin – additional programming (3)
- Tom Bukovac – electric guitars (1, 2, 4–9), acoustic guitar (4, 5), bass guitar (7), slide guitar (9)
- Chris Graffagnino – acoustic guitar (1, 6, 10), electric guitars
- Adam Shoenfeld – electric guitars (1, 8), acoustic guitar (8)
- Gary Burnette – electric guitars (5, 6, 9)
- Akil Thompson – electric guitars (6, 9), bass guitar (6)
- Tyler Burkum – electric guitars (7)
- Calvin Turner – bass guitar (1, 3), string arrangements (10)
- Tony Hall – bass guitar (2, 5, 8)
- Tony Lucido – bass guitar (4, 8–10)
- Chad Gilmore – drums (1, 2, 4, 7–9)
- Jeremy Lutito – drums (3)
- Dan Needham – drums (6, 10)
- Javier Solís – percussion (2, 10), congas (10)
- Mark Douthit – saxophones (1, 4)
- Roy Agee – trombone (1, 4)
- Steve Patrick – trumpet (1, 4)
- David Davidson – violin (1), strings (5, 7, 10), string arrangements (5, 7)
- Eleonore Denig – violin (3)
- David Angell – strings (5, 7, 10)
- Monisa Angell – strings (5, 7, 10)
- John Catchings – strings (5, 7, 10)
- Pamela Sixfin – strings (5, 7)
- Kristin Wilkinson – strings (7)
- Peter Groenwald – backing vocals (3)
- Mark Crozier – backing vocals (8)
- Nia Allen – backing vocals (9)
- Nirva Ready – backing vocals (9)

Choir on "Let Me Do It Over"

- Nia Allen
- Latera Conley
- Jason Eskridge
- Calvin Nowell
- Nirva Ready

=== Production ===
- Pete Ganbarg – A&R
- Gregg Nadel – A&R, product manager
- Jamie Kenney – producer, additional recording
- Joe Baldridge – recording
- Dan Rudin – horn recording
- Bobby Shin – string recording
- Mark Crozier – additional recording
- Ben Phillips – additional recording
- Justin Tocket – additional recording
- Korey Richey – assistant engineer
- Michael H. Brauer – mixing at Electric Lady Studios (New York City, New York)
- Ryan Gilligan – mix assistant, Pro Tools engineer
- Bob Ludwig – mastering at Gateway Mastering (Portland, Maine)
- Lanre Gaba – A&R administration
- Mark Obriski – art direction, design
- Reid Rolls – photography
- Ross DuPré – management

== Singles ==
"Lucky" and "Only Everything" were released as the two lead singles from the album. The former was performed on Lopez Tonight on June 13, 2011, while both songs have garnered some radio airplay on the Triple A chart.

"Cruel" was released as the album's third single. The music video premiered on August 10, 2011.

== Reception ==
The album debuted at #102 on the Billboard 200 chart, and #37 on the Rock Albums chart.
