= Giddy On Up =

Single by Laura Bell Bundy

from the album Achin' and Shakin'
- Released: February 16, 2010
- Genre: Country, dance
- Length: 3:28
- Label: Mercury Nashville
- Songwriters: Laura Bell Bundy, Jeff Cohen, Mike Shimshack
- Producer: Mike Shimshack

Laura Bell Bundy singles chronology
"Giddy On Up" (2010)	"Drop On By" (2010)

Music video
- "Giddy On Up" on YouTube

"Giddy On Up" is a debut song by American stage actress and singer Laura Bell Bundy. Co-written by Bundy, it was released to country music radio in February 2010 as the lead-off single from her debut album Achin' and Shakin', which was released on April 13, 2010. Bundy wrote this song with Jeff Cohen and Mike Shimshack.

Bundy performed the song on the 2010 ACM Awards on April 18, 2010 and on the 2010 CMT Music Awards on June 9, 2010.

== Content ==
"Giddy On Up" is an up-tempo country song, driven by fiddle and banjo with a prominent brass section in the pre-chorus. The song's female narrator confronts her man ("Baby where you been, its half-past ten"), making note of the many signs that suggest he has been cheating on her with another woman ("Smilin' a lot when you look at your phone / There's a change in your tone"). In the bridge, she tells him that he's made a mistake by cheating on her, telling him to "giddy on up, giddy on out."

== Critical reception ==
Upon release, "Giddy On Up" received mixed reviews from critics. Bobby Peacock of Roughstock gave the song a positive review, favoring the song's production and Bundy's vocal phrasing, which he compares to fellow country artists Dolly Parton and Jennifer Nettles. He concluded that while there is "no shortage of songs in this same vein," it is "radio-friendly" and "different enough sound to stand out." Dan Milliken of Country Universe gave the song a B rating, referring to it as "just another cutesy girl-power kiss-off song," but favoring the song's production and vocal performance, concluding that it "has more vision and personality than any of the other crossover attempts by the legion of boring, pretty girls."

Slant Magazine critic Jonathan Keefe also gave the single a mixed-to-positive review, praising the song's "awareness of pop songcraft and structure" and its "inventive production" for drawing favorable comparisons to the work of Big & Rich, Little Big Town, Taylor Swift, and pop producer Mark Ronson, but noting that Bundy "overdoes her vocal performance" and questioning whether the performance is played for sincerity or for camp. Stephen M. Deusner of Engine 145 gave the song a thumbs-down, saying that he considered the song's subject "well-trod" and that the song, overall, "is more about archetypes than real characters, so Bundy’s performance is consequently and fatally broad."

== Music video ==
The music video, which was directed by Shane Drake, premiered on CMT on January 18, 2010. In the video, Bundy is shown confronting her cowboy love interest (portrayed by New York City actor and personal trainer Brian Patrick Murphy) while performing on stage in a saloon. He goes up to his room and tries to kiss a woman who storms up to him before he realizes that it is Bundy. From then on, scenes of the confrontation are intercut with Bundy singing with her fellow performers on the bar. Bundy causes her love interest to fall out of a window and land in the street, where she confronts him once again. This time, she pulls out a gun and shoots at him, which knocks off his clothes (leaving him with only his boxers, his belt, and his hat). Bundy proceeds to intimidate him with a group of dancers performing behind her, before riding off on her horse, dragging the tied-up cowboy behind.

The video was nominated for Female Video of the Year and USA Weekend Breakthrough Video of the Year on the 2010 CMT Music Awards, and Breakthrough Artist Video of the Year at the 2010 American Country Awards.

== Chart performance ==
"Giddy On Up" debuted at #60 on the U.S. Billboard Hot Country Songs chart for the week of February 20, 2010. A remix of the song debuted at #46 on the U.S. Billboard Hot Dance Club Songs chart for the week of April 10, 2010. The song was Bundy's first Top 40 hit, reaching a peak of #31 on the U.S. Billboard Hot Country Songs chart for the week of May 8, 2010.

Chart (2010)	Peak position
US Billboard Bubbling Under Hot 100	7
US Hot Country Songs (Billboard)	31
US Dance Club Songs (Billboard)	43
