= Getting Dressed in the Dark =

2010 album by Jaron and the Long Road to Love

Studio album by Jaron and the Long Road to Love
- Released: June 22, 2010
- Recorded: 2009–2010
- Genre: Country
- Length: 36:40
- Labels: Jaronwood/Universal Republic; Big Machine
- Producer: Jaron Lowenstein

Singles from Getting Dressed in the Dark
- 1. "Pray for You" Released: November 30, 2009; 2. "That's Beautiful to Me" Released: September 7, 2010; 3. "It's a Good Thing" Released: April 18, 2011

Professional ratings
Review scores
| Source | Rating |
|---|---|
| Allmusic | 2.5/5 stars |
| Roughstock | 4/5 stars |

Getting Dressed in the Dark is the debut country music album of artist Jaron Lowenstein, more commonly known as Jaron and the Long Road to Love. It was released on June 22, 2010 via Universal Republic.

The album's first single, "Pray for You", was released in November 2009, and has become a Top 20 single on the Billboard Hot Country Songs chart, as well as a Top 40 single on the Billboard Hot 100. The album's second single, "That's Beautiful to Me" was released on radio on September 7, 2010, but it failed to reach the Top 40. A third single, "It's a Good Thing", was released on April 18, 2011, but it failed to chart.

== Content ==
Lowenstein wrote or co-wrote all of the songs on the album. "It's a Good Thing" was co-written by Sarah Buxton, and Lowenstein's twin brother Evan, with whom he formerly recorded as Evan and Jaron.

== Critical reception ==
Matt Bjorke of Roughstock gave the album a four-star rating, calling each song "well-written and produced country/pop tunes" and a "strong storyteller's album." Giving it two-and-a-half stars, Andrew Leahey of Allmusic thought that the lyrics were "ballsy" by country music standards, but thought that the album's sound was bland and more influenced by pop than country.

== Track listing ==
All tracks are written by Jaron Lowenstein, except where noted.

| No. | Title | Length |
|---|---|---|
| 1. | "Petals Back on the Rose" | 3:52 |
| 2. | "Meantime Girl" | 3:06 |
| 3. | "Beat Back Love" (Greg Barnhill, Jaron Lowenstein) | 3:23 |
| 4. | "Without Her Leaving" | 3:53 |
| 5. | "It's a Good Thing" (Sarah Buxton, Andy Davis, J. Lowenstein, Evan Lowenstein) | 3:47 |
| 6. | "Without a Woman I Love" | 3:52 |
| 7. | "Kill Me For Loving You" | 4:04 |
| 8. | "I Hope You Hit Traffic" | 4:26 |
| 9. | "Pray for You" (Joel Brentlinger, J. Lowenstein) | 3:10 |
| 10. | "That's Beautiful to Me" | 3:07 |

== Personnel ==
- Greg Barnhill - acoustic guitar, background vocals
- Robert Blair - drums
- Jimmy Dulin - bass guitar, electric guitar, drum loops, percussion, programming, soloist
- Mike Durham - electric guitar
- Jaron Lowenstein - acoustic guitar, organ, percussion, piano, lead vocals, background vocals
- Jason Scheff - piano, background vocals
- Rex Schnelle - banjo, acoustic guitar, electric guitar
- Paul Scholten - drums, percussion
- Randy Smith - bass guitar
- Tim Galloway - electric guitar
- Jimmy Wallace - keyboards
- Danny Wilde - background vocals
- Jonathan Yudkin - mandolin, violin

== Chart performance ==
The album debuted and peaked at number 2 on the Billboard Top Country Albums and number 16 on the Billboard 200, selling 23,916 copies in its first week. As of November 2010, the album has sold 110,000 copies in the U.S.

=== Album ===
| Chart (2010) | Peak position |
|---|---|
| U.S. Billboard Top Country Albums | 2 |
| U.S. Billboard 200 | 16 |

=== End of year charts ===
| Chart (2010) | Year-end 2010 |
|---|---|
| US Billboard Top Country Albums | 54 |

=== Singles ===
| Year | Single | Peak chart positions | | |
| Year | Single | US Country | US | CAN |
|---|---|---|---|---|
| 2009 | "Pray for You" | 13 | 34 | 70 |
| 2010 | "That's Beautiful to Me" | 44 | — | — |
| 2011 | "It's a Good Thing" | — | — | — |
"—" denotes releases that did not chart
