= Pinto (album) =

2022 studio album by Sykamore

Studio album by Sykamore
- Released: August 12, 2022
- Genre: Country pop
- Length: 39:03
- Label: Independent
- Producer: Michael Knox; Bobby Campbell

Sykamore chronology
California King (2020)	Pinto (2022)	Through the Static (2024)

Singles from Pinto
- 1. "Pinto" Released: September 15, 2022; 2. "Dancing in the Dark" Released: February 28, 2023

Pinto is the debut studio album by Canadian country artist Sykamore. The album includes ten songs that were previously released. Michael Knox produced every track on the album with the exception of the final track "Wallflower".

== Background ==
Jordan Ostrom, known professionally as Sykamore, wrote or co-wrote every song on the album. The album name, Pinto, was inspired by the Ford Pinto, a car from the 1970s. Sykamore stated that she read a manual for the car in a shop in Franklin, Tennessee that described it as "this car that was really messed up, causing engine fires and blowing up". She used this as inspiration for the title track, opting to write a song "where the car is kind of a metaphor for young love or first love for somebody" that was "at times toxic but [a] very exciting relationship. She noted that she was able to "indulge her pop influences" on this record, and credited producer Michael Knox for creating "strong dynamics" in the music. She initially hoped to release the album in 2020, but the COVID-19 pandemic altered her plans. She instead released a five-song extended play titled California King that year, with all five songs as well her intermittent promotional singles being included on Pinto. Each song was written and recorded after she fully moved from Alberta to Nashville, and Sykamore viewed the album as the end of her "first chapter in Nashville".

== Critical reception ==
Eric Volmers of the Calgary Herald stated that the album is "album is full of savvy pop songs that maintain enough of a twang to appeal to mainstream country radio". Roman Mitz of The Music Express described "Wallflower" as the most "powerful" song in the album. Nanci Dagg of Canadian Beats Media referred to Pinto as an "equal combination of country and pop". Jason MacNeil of Parton and Pearl said that Sykamore "has a lovely delivery to the primarily highbrow pop country material," on the album, adding that she "isn't crashing and burning with Pinto, more like confidently galloping on a horse of the same name". Kat Harlton of The Harlton Empire stated that the album "pairs empathetic storytelling with instantly memorable hooks and sing-along choruses that capture the emotional rollercoaster of youth and young love". Jenna Weishar of Front Porch Music declared that Pinto is "a journey for listeners, packed with a track for any type of listener".

== Track listing ==
Pinto
No.	Title	Writer(s)	Length
1.	"Pinto"	Jordan Ostrom	3:00
2.	"Just 4 July"	Ostrom, Jimi Bell Jr., Trannie Anderson	3:10
3.	"Dancing in the Dark"	Ostrom, Benjamin Johnson	3:09
4.	"Cheap Thrills"	Ostrom, Jaron Boyer, Ben Stennis	2:35
5.	"Out of Luck"	Ostrom, Bobby Campbell	3:08
6.	"Record High"	Ostrom, Bobby Hamrick, Jeff Cohen	3:00
7.	"California King"	Ostrom, Justin Morgan, Justin Weaver	3:18
8.	"Where to Find Me"	Ostrom, Austin Taylor Smith, Jason Massey	3:16
9.	"Go Easy on Me"	Ostrom, Campbell, Liz Rose	3:37
10.	"Local Singles"	Ostrom, Chris Stevens, Deric Ruttan	3:22
11.	"Stay Broke"	Ostrom, Massey	3:35
12.	"Wallflower"	Ostrom, Nathan Chapman	3:48
Total length:			39:03

== Awards and nominations ==
Year	Association	Category	Nominated work	Result	Ref.
2023	Country Music Alberta	Album of the Year	Pinto	Nominated	

== Release history ==
Release formats for Pinto
Country	Date	Format	Label	Ref.
Various	August 12, 2022	Digital download	Sykamore	
Various	August 12, 2022	Streaming	Sykamore	
Various	August 16, 2022	Compact disc	Sykamore	
