= Achin' and Shakin' =

Studio album by Laura Bell Bundy
- Released: April 13, 2010
- Genre: Country
- Length: 44:23
- Label: Mercury Nashville
- Producers: Nathan Chapman; Mike Shimshack; Kyle Kelso

Laura Bell Bundy chronology
Longing for a Place Already Gone (2007)	Achin' and Shakin' (2010)	Another Piece of Me (2015)

Singles from Achin' and Shakin'
- 1. "Giddy On Up" Released: February 16, 2010; 2. "Drop On By" Released: August 9, 2010

Professional ratings
Review scores
Source	Rating
Allmusic	3/5 stars
The New York Times	favorable
Slant	4/5 stars

Achin' and Shakin' is the second studio album released by Broadway actress and Mercury Nashville American Country Music recording artist Laura Bell Bundy. The album which was released on April 13, 2010, is Bundy's first mainstream album; her first album, Longing for a Place Already Gone, was self-released in 2007. Achin' and Shakin' features the singles "Giddy On Up" and "Drop On By".

== Promotion ==
Bundy appeared on CMT's Top Twenty Countdown to talk about the new album and debut a fan-made version of her "Giddy On Up" video on April 9, 2010. She also performed "Giddy On Up" on the 2010 Academy of Country Music Awards on April 18, 2010. She appeared on Good Morning America on April 21, The Tonight Show with Jay Leno on April 29 and appeared on Chelsea Lately on May 11, 2010.

== Content ==
The album is divided into two themes: "Achin'", which comprises tracks 1–6, and "Shakin'", which comprises tracks 7–12. Nathan Chapman produced the "Achin'" tracks; Mike Shimshack produced "Giddy On Up", "I'm No Good for Ya Baby", and "Everybody", while Kyle Kelso produced "Rebound", "Boyfriend?", and "If You Want My Love".

== Track listing ==
No.	Title	Writer(s)	Length
1.	"Drop On By"	Brice Long, Ronnie Rogers	3:09
2.	"Curse the Bed"	Bundy, Nathan Chapman, Andrew Dorff	3:24
3.	"Cigarette"	Bundy, Chapman	3:51
4.	"Please"	Bundy, Long, Tommy Lee James	3:40
5.	"Homecoming Queen"	Bundy	4:31
6.	"When It All Goes South"	Bundy, Chapman	4:29
7.	"Giddy On Up"	Bundy, Jeff Cohen, Mike Shimshack	3:28
8.	"I'm No Good (For Ya Baby)"	Bundy, Cohen, Shimshack	4:02
9.	"Rebound"	Bundy, Jerry Flowers	3:08
10.	"Boyfriend?"	Bundy, Barry Dean, Luke Laird	3:54
11.	"If You Want My Love"	Bundy	3:24
12.	"Everybody"	Bundy, Laird, Shimshack	3:13

== Personnel ==
- Laura Bell Bundy - lead vocals
- Chris Carmichael - strings
- Nathan Chapman - acoustic guitar, electric guitar, background vocals
- Stephanie Chapman - background vocals
- Chad Cromwell - drums
- Dan Dugmore - steel guitar, mandolin
- Aubrey Haynie - fiddle
- Kirk "Jelly Roll" Johnson - harmonica
- Kyle Kelso - bass guitar, acoustic guitar, Hammond B-3 organ, percussion, programming
- Tim Lauer - accordion, Hammond B-3 organ, piano, pump organ, Wurlitzer
- Duke Levine - dobro, baritone guitar, electric guitar, slide guitar
- Rob McNelley - electric guitar
- Marc Muller - banjo, dobro, fiddle, acoustic guitar, electric guitar, mandolin, steel guitar, synthesizer bass
- Steve Nathan - Hammond B-3 organ, Wurlitzer
- Angela Primm - background vocals
- Michael Rhodes - bass guitar
- Mike Shimshack - bass guitar, acoustic guitar, Hammond B-3 organ, percussion, programming
- Ilya Toshinsky - acoustic guitar
- Gayle Mayes-West - background vocals
- Nir Z. - drums

== Chart performance ==
The album debuted at number 5 on the U.S. Billboard Top Country Albums chart and #28 on the U.S. Billboard 200, selling nearly 15,000 copies in its first week, becoming the highest debut album sales by a female country artist since Julianne Hough in 2008. As of June 26, 2010, the album has sold 72,181 copies.

Chart (2010)	Peak position
U.S. Billboard Top Country Albums	5
U.S. Billboard 200	28
Norwegian Albums Chart	34

=== End of year charts ===
Chart (2010)	Year-end 2010
US Billboard Top Country Albums	58
