= Crazy for This Girl =

2000 single by Evan and Jaron

Single by Evan and Jaron

from the album Evan and Jaron
- B-side: "Luckiest of the Lucky Ones"; "Can't Get You Off My Mind"; "Nature Co."
- Released: July 24, 2000
- Length: 3:22
- Label: Columbia
- Songwriters: Jaron Lowenstein; Jeff Cohen
- Producers: Evan Lowenstein; Jaron Lowenstein; John Fields

Evan and Jaron singles chronology
"And Then She Says" (1998)	"Crazy for This Girl" (2000)	"From My Head to My Heart" (2001)

Music video
- "Crazy for This Girl" on YouTube

"Crazy for This Girl" is a song by American pop rock duo Evan and Jaron, released on July 24, 2000, as the first single from their third studio album, Evan and Jaron. The song peaked at number 15 on the US Billboard Hot 100 chart and number four on the Billboard Adult Top 40. It also became a hit in Canada, Italy and New Zealand, reaching number nine on the Italian Singles Chart, number 35 on the New Zealand Singles Chart, and number 45 on the Canadian RPM 100 Hit Tracks chart.

== Music video ==
Directed by Dani Jacobs, the video features Evan and Jaron's tour bus traveling on a highway at night before stopping at a gas station and diner called "Four Aces". They enter the diner and are persuaded by some girls who give them guitars (from the boss's office) to perform on stage. It attracts a crowd of people who were informed by one of the diner's bartenders played by Daphne Zuniga. An alternative version of the video features scenes from the third season of Dawson's Creek.

== Track listings ==
US CD and cassette single

1. "Crazy for This Girl" (album version) – 3:22
2. "Crazy for This Girl" (acoustic version) – 3:15

US 7-inch single

A. "Crazy for This Girl" – 3:22
B. "From My Head to My Heart" – 3:10

European CD1

1. "Crazy for This Girl" (radio edit) – 2:35
2. "Luckiest of the Lucky Ones" (radio edit) – 4:16

European CD2

1. "Crazy for This Girl" (radio edit) – 2:35
2. "Luckiest of the Lucky Ones" (radio edit) – 4:16
3. "Can't Get You Off My Mind" – 3:47
4. "Crazy for This Girl" (video)

Australian CD single

1. "Crazy for This Girl" (radio edit) – 2:35
2. "Crazy for This Girl" (album version) – 3:22
3. "Nature Co." – 4:10
4. "Can't Get You Off My Mind" – 3:47

== Charts ==
=== Weekly charts ===
Chart (2000–2001)	Peak position
Canada Top Singles (RPM)	45 (Note: "Crazy for This Girl" reached number 45 when RPM ceased publication in November 2000.)
Canada Adult Contemporary (RPM)	34 (Note: "Crazy for This Girl" reached number 34 when RPM ceased publication in November 2000.)
Canada CHR (Nielsen BDS)	13
Italy (FIMI)	9
Netherlands (Dutch Top 40 Tipparade)	12
Netherlands (Single Top 100)	98
New Zealand (Recorded Music NZ)	37
US Billboard Hot 100	15
US Adult Contemporary (Billboard)	27
US Adult Pop Airplay (Billboard)	4
US Pop Airplay (Billboard)	9

=== Year-end charts ===
Chart (2000)	Position
US Adult Top 40 (Billboard)	44
US Mainstream Top 40 (Billboard)	93

Chart (2001)	Position
US Billboard Hot 100	54
US Adult Top 40 (Billboard)	12
US Mainstream Top 40 (Billboard)	47

== Release history ==
Region	Date	Format(s)	Label(s)	Ref(s).
United States	July 24, 2000	Adult contemporary; hot adult contemporary; modern adult contemporary radio	Columbia	
United States	July 25, 2000	Contemporary hit radio	Columbia	
United States	February 13, 2001	7-inch vinyl; CD; cassette	Columbia	
