= Marc Broussard =

American musician

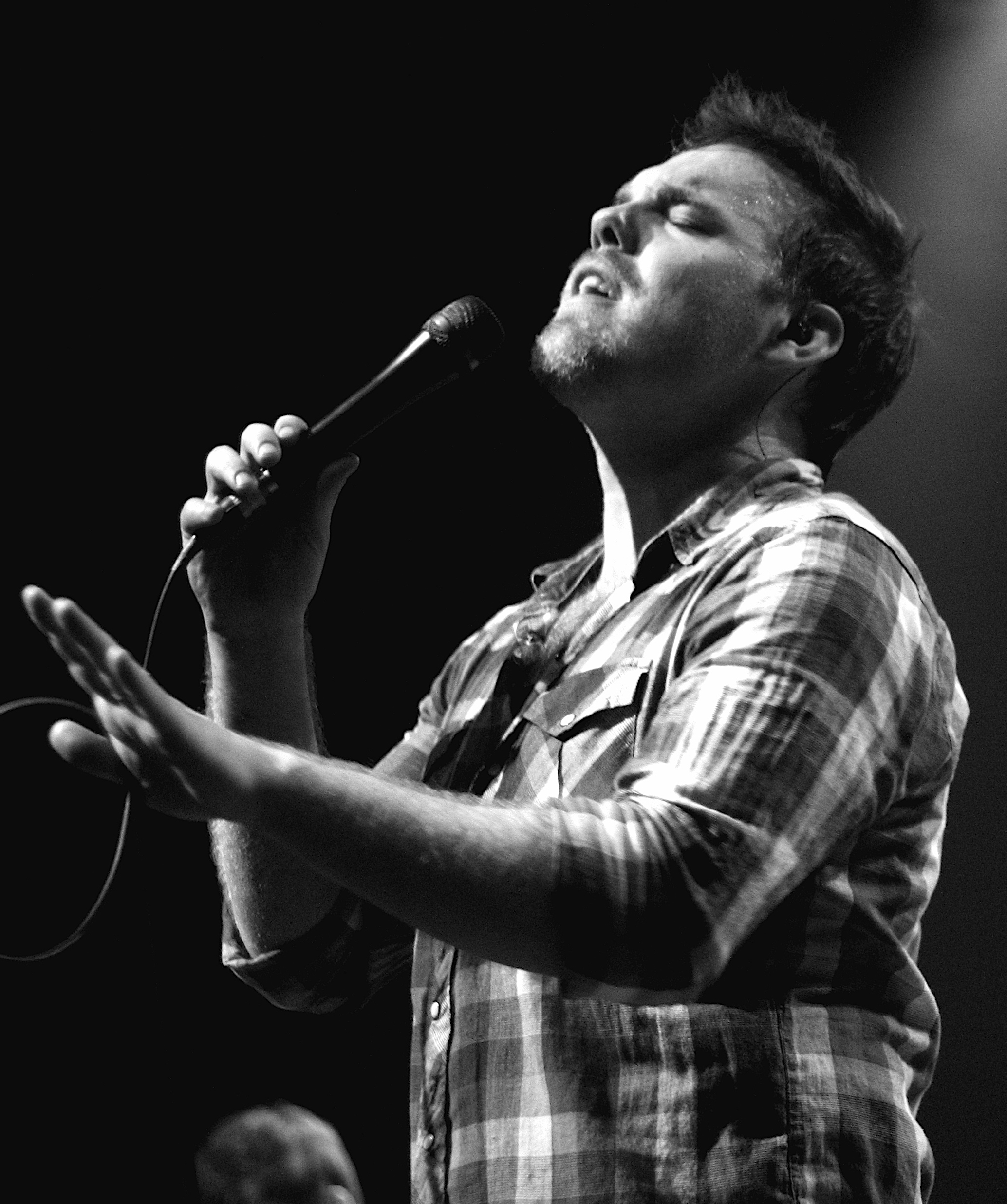
- Broussard performing in 2011

Background information
- Born: January 14, 1982 (age 44); Carencro, Louisiana, U.S.
- Genres: Soul, rock, pop, swamp pop
- Occupation: Singer-songwriter
- Instruments: Vocals, guitar
- Years active: 2004–present
- Labels: Island, Vanguard, Atlantic, G-Man Records, KTBA
- Website: www.marcbroussard.com

Marc Broussard (born January 14, 1982) is an American singer-songwriter. His style is best described as "bayou soul", a mix of funk, blues, R&B, rock and pop, matched with distinct Southern roots. He has released twelve studio albums, one live album, and three EPs, and has charted twice on Hot Adult Top 40 Tracks.

Broussard has performed on TV programs including The Tonight Show with Jay Leno, Breakfast with the Arts, Jimmy Kimmel Live!, Late Night with Conan O'Brien, The Early Show, Larry King Live, Lopez Tonight, and CBS's Saturday Morning's Second Cup Cafe. His music has been featured on shows such as Clash of the Choirs, in which "Home" was performed by a Blake Shelton–led choir.

== Early life ==
Marc Broussard is the son of Ted Broussard, an acclaimed Louisiana Hall of Fame guitarist and former member of The Boogie Kings. Marc was raised in Carencro, Louisiana and Lafayette, Louisiana.

== Musical career ==
In 2001 Broussard was part of Y, a Christian rock band based out of New Iberia, Louisiana.

In 2002, Broussard began a solo career, independently releasing Momentary Setback and "The Wanderer", a song about self-discovery. A re-worked version of the song appears on his first major album, Carencro (Island Records), released on August 3, 2004. The album's title pays tribute to his hometown of Carencro, Louisiana. It featured the singles "Where You Are" and "Home".

In 2007, he released S.O.S.: Save Our Soul, an album consisting almost entirely of cover versions. The album was his first to reach the Top 100 of the Billboard 200 in the US, debuting and peaking at No. 96.

Broussard finished recording the Must Be The Water EP on the Rock Boat VII in January 2008 and released it later that year. He was no stranger to the Rock Boat, an annual ocean liner cruise and music festival. This was Broussard's first release with his new label, Atlantic Records, with which he signed a multi-album contract in 2007.

Singer Kelly Clarkson performed "Home" as part of her live set in 2006 and 2007. His song "Must Be the Water" was the theme song for the 2008 NBA All-Star Game.

In 2008, Broussard released Keep Coming Back. The song "Hard Knocks" from this album was featured in the last episode of the 2009 season of the HBO series Hard Knocks, which features the Cincinnati Bengals football team.

Broussard's fourth full-length album, Marc Broussard, was released on June 14, 2011. An early EP release, Marc Broussard EP, was released on March 22, 2011, and features the singles "Lucky" and "Only Everything". A third single, "Cruel", followed later that year. In late 2012, he signed a deal with Vanguard Records.

In November 2015, he independently released a Christmas album, Magnolias and Mistletoe, which included the single "Almost Christmas".

In 2016, he released S.O.S. 2: Save our Soul, a sequel to his '70s-influenced S.O.S.: Save Our Soul cover album, which included the single "Cry to Me". He donated 50% of the profits to City of Refuge.

He released Easy to Love on September 15, 2017.

In February 2023, he released S.O.S. 4: Blues for Your Soul, a collection of blues music cover versions co-produced by Joe Bonamassa.

In September 2024, he released Time Is a Thief.

== Personal life ==
Broussard married his wife, Sonya, on Rock Boat in January 2008. They have four children. They live in Carencro, Louisiana, where his family has lived for generations.

=== Philanthropy ===
Broussard founded the Momentary Setback Fund to benefit victims of Hurricane Katrina and Hurricane Rita. He released the album Bootleg to Benefit the Victims of Hurricane Katrina in 2005, with all proceeds going to help rebuild Broussard's home state, Louisiana. He is also involved in the United Way of America and Habitat for Humanity. In 2007, Broussard was involved in an Entertain the Troops tour in the Middle East.

== Discography ==
=== Studio albums ===
Title	Details	Peak chart positions				
Title	Details	US	US Rock	US R&B	US Heat	US Indie
Momentary Setback	Release date: September 7, 2002; Label: Ripley Records; Formats: CD, cassette	—	—	—	—	—
Carencro	Release date: August 3, 2004; Label: Island Records; Formats: CD, music download	—	—	—	30	—
S.O.S.: Save Our Soul	Release date: June 26, 2007; Label: Vanguard Records; Formats: CD, music download	96	—	59	—	9
Keep Coming Back	Release date: September 16, 2008; Label: Atlantic Records; Formats: CD, music download	136	—	—	—	—
Marc Broussard	Release date: June 14, 2011; Label: Atlantic Records; Formats: CD, music download	102	27	—	—	—
A Life Worth Living	Release date: July 29, 2014; Label: Vanguard Records; Formats: CD, music download	85	—	—	—	9
Magnolias & Mistletoe	Release date: November 6, 2015; Label: G-Man Records; Formats: CD, music download	—	—	—	—	—
S.O.S. 2: Save Our Soul: Soul on a Mission	Release date: September 30, 2016; Label: G-Man Records; Formats: CD, music download	—	—	—	—	29
Easy to Love	Release date: September 15, 2017; Label: G-Man Records; Formats: CD, music download	—	—	—	—	—
S.O.S. 3: A Lullaby Collection	Release date: November 15, 2019; Label: G-Man Records; Formats: CD, music download	—	—	—	—	—
S.O.S. 4: Blues For Your Soul	Release date: March 3, 2023; Label: KTBA Records; Formats: CD, vinyl, music download	—	—	—	—	—
Time is a Thief	Release date: September 27, 2024; Label: G-Man Touring Inc; Formats: CD, vinyl, music download	—	—	—	—	—
S.O.S. V: Songs of the '50s	Release date: February 06, 2026; Label: Big Lake Music; Formats: CD, vinyl, music download	—	—	—	—	—
"—" denotes releases that did not chart

=== Live albums ===
Title	Details
Live at Full Sail University	Release date: April 2, 2013 (Digital) / April 9, 2013 (CD); Label: G-Man Records; Formats: CD, music download

=== Extended plays ===
Title	Details
Bootleg to Benefit the Victims of Hurricane Katrina	Release date: October 25, 2005; Label: Island Def Jam; Formats: CD, music download
Must Be the Water	Release date: February 19, 2008; Label: Atlantic Records; Formats: CD, music download
Marc Broussard EP	Release date: March 22, 2011; Label: Atlantic Records; Formats: music download

=== Singles ===
Year	Single	Peak positions	Album
Year	Single	US Adult	Album
2002	"The Wanderer"	—	Momentary Setback
2004	"Where You Are"	37	Carencro
2005	"Home"	40	Carencro
2007	"Love and Happiness"	—	S.O.S.: Save Our Soul
2007	"Come in from the Cold"	—	S.O.S.: Save Our Soul
2008	"Hard Knocks"	—	Keep Coming Back
2008	"Keep Coming Back"	—	Keep Coming Back
2009	"When It's Good" (with LeAnn Rimes)	—	Keep Coming Back
2011	"Lucky"	—	Marc Broussard
2011	"Only Everything"	—	Marc Broussard
2011	"Cruel"	—	Marc Broussard
2014	"Hurricane Heart"	—	A Life Worth Living
2015	"Almost Christmas"	—	Magnolias and Mistletoe
2016	"Cry to Me"	—	S.O.S. 2: Save Our Soul: Soul on a Mission
2017	"Send Me a Sign"	—	Easy to Love
2017	"Easy to Love"	—	Easy to Love
2017	"Please Please Please"	—	Easy to Love
2017	"Gavin's Song (Piano Version)"	1	Easy to Love
2017	"Don't Be Afraid to Call Me"	—	Easy to Love
"—" denotes releases that did not chart

=== Other album appearances ===
- Sail Away: The Songs of Randy Newman (2006) (Song: "You Can Leave Your Hat On")
- Lemonade (G. Love) (2006) (Song: "Let the Music Play" with Ben Harper)
- Goin' Home: A Tribute to Fats Domino (2007) (Song: "Rising Sun" with Sam Bush)
- Family (LeAnn Rimes) (2007) (Song: "Nothing Wrong")
- Under Summer Sun (Matt Wertz) (2008) (Song: "The Way I Feel")
- Everything She Was (Josh Hoge) (2008) (Song: "Take It Or Leave It")
- Light of Day: A Tribute to Bruce Springsteen (Various Artists) (2008) (Song: "Back in Your Arms")
- Serve2 (Fighting Hunger & Poverty) (2008) (Song: "Bring It On Home To Me")
- Dark Streets – Original Motion Picture Soundtrack (2008) (Song: "When You Lose Somebody")
- Christmas Gumbo (Various Artists) (2008) (Song: "On Santa's Way Home")
- Backatown (Trombone Shorty) (2010) (Song: "Right to Complain")
- Home by the River (Drew Young) (2011) (Song: "Home by the River" "Changing Lanes and Holding Hands")
- LIVE (Scott Alan) (2012) (Song: "In This Moment")
- Öpfelboum u Palme (Special Edition) (Ritschi) (2015) (Song: "Nume 5 Minute")
- Home (Pat Green) (2015) (Song: "Good Night in New Orleans")
- I Wanna Sing Right: Rediscovering Lomax in the Evangeline Country (Various Artists) (2015) (Song: "When I Die")
- Overture (Daniel and Laura Curtis) (2016) (Song: "What Happened to Yesterday?")
- Christmas Soul (Various Artists) (2017) (Song: "Please Come Home For Christmas")
- Father Figures – Soundtrack (2017) (Song: "Tell Me the Truth" with Lord Netty)
- A Jazz Celebration of The Allman Brothers Band (2019) (Songs: "Statesboro Blues" and "Whipping Post")
