= A Life Worth Living (album) =

Studio album by Marc Broussard
- Released: July 29, 2014
- Recorded: 2012–2014
- Studio: The Smoakstack and Minutia Studios (Nashville, Tennessee): Spitfire Studios (Los Angeles, California)
- Genre: R&B, pop, rock
- Label: Vanguard
- Producer: Paul Moak: Warren Huart; Philip Allen

Marc Broussard chronology
Marc Broussard (2011)	A Life Worth Living (2014)	Magnolias and Mistletoe (2015)

Professional ratings
Review scores
Source	Rating
Allmusic	4/5 stars

A Life Worth Living is the sixth studio album by Marc Broussard.

Following the release of a live album/DVD Live at Full Sail University in 2013, and re-signing with Vanguard Records (who released his S.O.S.: Save Our Soul album in 2007), Broussard set to release his new studio album in 2014. The album cover was unveiled on May 13, 2014, and the set's first single "Hurricane Heart" premiered on May 19, 2014. The album was released on July 29, 2014.

== Track listing ==
All tracks are written by Marc Broussard, except where noted.

A Life Worth Living – Standard edition
No.	Title	Music	Length
1.	"Hurricane Heart"	Broussard, Sean McConnell, Paul Moak	2:54
2.	"Dyin' Man"		4:23
3.	"Perfect To Me"	Philip Allen, Warren Huart, Lee Anna James	3:33
4.	"Man Ain't Supposed To Cry"	Broussard, Gibb Droll	4:07
5.	"Edge of Heaven"	Broussard, Chad Gilmore, Jim McGorman, Robb Vallier	4:12
6.	"A Life Worth Living"		3:40
7.	"Honesty"	Broussard, Moak	3:59
8.	"Another Day" (featuring Genevieve Schatz)	Broussard, Allen, Huart	4:04
9.	"Weight of the World"	Broussard, Droll, Gilmore	3:24
10.	"Shine"	Broussard, Droll	5:31
11.	"Give Em Hell"		4:20
12.	"I'll Never Know"		3:34
Total length:			47:41

A Life Worth Living – Deluxe edition, digital download only
No.	Title	Length
13.	"Hurricane Heart (Acoustic)"	2:58
14.	"Edge of Heaven (Acoustic)"	3:41
15.	"A Life Worth Living (Acoustic)"	3:16
16.	"Honesty (Acoustic)"	4:18
17.	"Weight of the World (Acoustic)"	3:33
18.	"Shine (Acoustic)"	5:06
19.	"I'll Never Know (Acoustic)"	3:38
20.	"One Foot in the Ground"	3:40
21.	"Leave the Lights On"	3:29
Total length:		81:20

== Personnel ==
- Marc Broussard – vocals, acoustic piano, acoustic guitars, electric guitars
- Jeff Babko – acoustic piano
- Tim Lauer – acoustic piano
- Steve Maggiora – keyboards, acoustic piano
- Paul Moak – acoustic piano, Hammond B3 organ, accordion, acoustic guitars, electric guitars, pedal steel guitar, bass, percussion, vibraphone, backing vocals
- Warren Huart – acoustic piano, acoustic guitars, electric guitars, slide guitar, mandolin
- Philip Allen – acoustic guitars, electric guitars, mandolin, bass, drums, percussion
- Tom Bukovac – acoustic guitars, electric guitars
- Tim Pierce – electric guitars, bass
- Tony Lucido – bass
- Devin Vaughan – drums, percussion
- Chad Gilmore – drums
- Johnny Haro – drums
- Genevieve Schatz – vocals (8)

=== Production ===
- Paul Moak – producer (1, 2, 4–7, 9–12), engineer (1, 2, 4–7, 9–12), mixing (2, 4–7, 9–12)
- Philip Allen – producer (3, 8), engineer (3, 8), mixing (3, 8)
- Warren Huart – producer (3, 8), engineer (3, 8), mixing (3, 8)
- Gary Paczosa – mixing (1)
- Shani Gandhi – mix assistant (1)
- Justin March – engineer (1, 2, 4–7, 9–12)
- Devin Vaughan – engineer (1, 2, 4–7, 9–12)
- Zack Zinck – assistant engineer (1, 2, 4–7, 9–12)
- Jim DeMain – mastering at Yes Master (Nashville, Tennessee) (1, 2, 4–7, 9–12)
- Richard Dodd – mastering at Richard Dodd Mastering (3, 8)
- Lani Crump – production coordinator
- Carrie Smith – art direction, design
- Rick Olivier – photography

== Singles ==
"Hurricane Heart" was released on May 19, 2014, on Broussard's official SoundCloud account, and was used in promos for the MissUSA pageant on NBC, of which Broussard was a featured musical guest.

A music video for "Shine" premiered on USA Today's website on June 25, 2014.

== Commercial performance ==
The album debuted at #85 on the Billboard Top 200 Albums Chart (Issue Date: August 16, 2014) and sold 3,600 in its debut week. It became his highest-charting album to date.
