= Teitur =

Teitur (Faroese pronunciation: [ˈtaitʊɹ]) is a male given name. In Old Norse the word means happy. In Modern Faroese, it is archaic but used as a male given name.

== People ==
- Teitur Gestsson (born 1992), Faroese football player and goalkeeper
- Teitur Lassen (born 1977), a musical artist from Faroe Islands.
- Teitur Thordarson (born 1952), Icelandic football coach.
