= Laura Bell Bundy =

American actress and singer

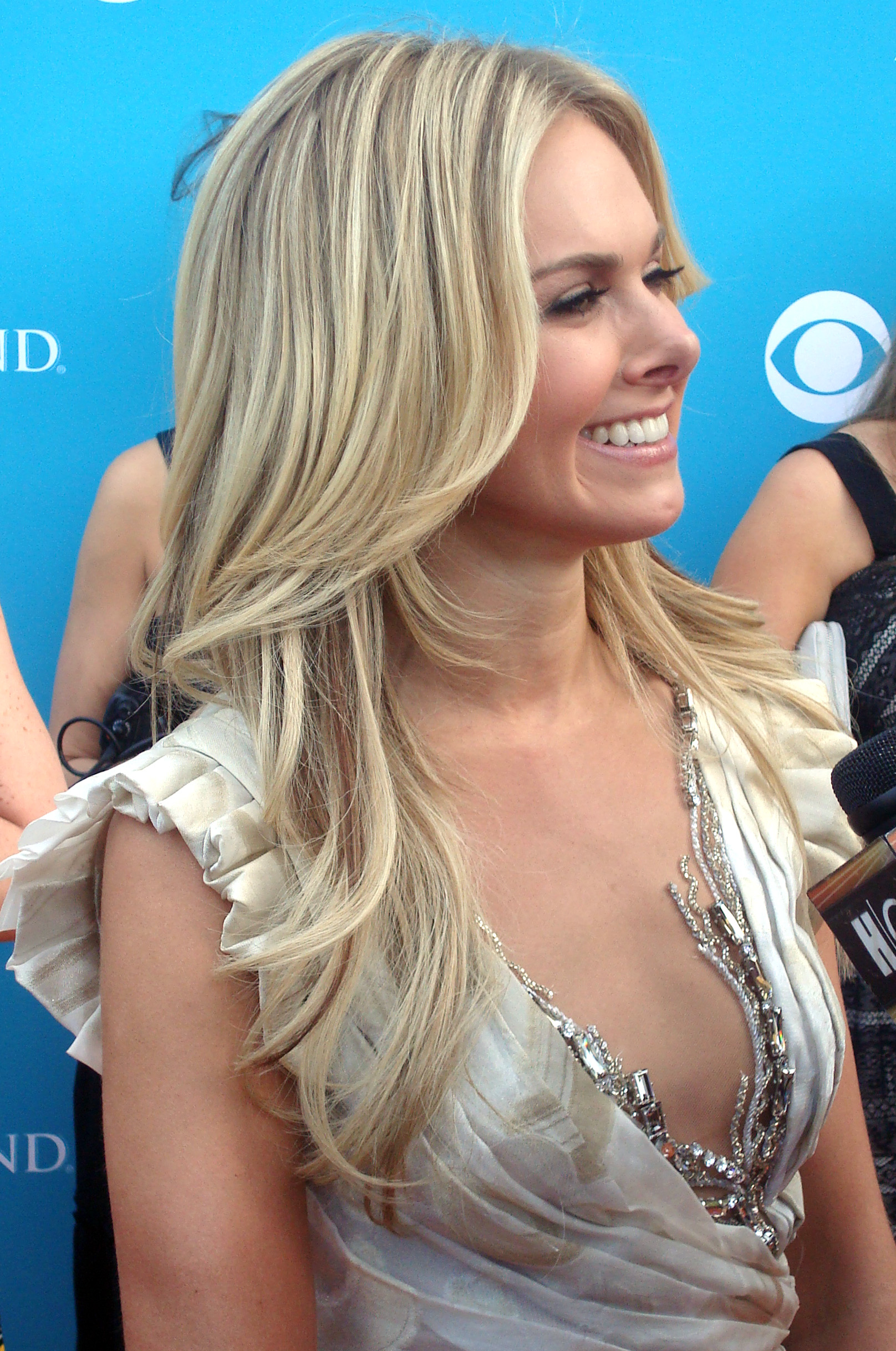
- Bell Bundy at 45th Annual Academy of Country Music Awards in April 2010
- Born: Laura Ashley Bell Bundy; April 10, 1981 (age 45); Euclid, Ohio, U.S.
- Other names: LBB; Laura Bell; Laura Bundy
- Education: New York University (attended)
- Occupations: Actress; singer; dancer; songwriter
- Years active: 1992–present
- Spouse: Thom Hinkle (m. 2017)
- Children: 1
- Website: laurabellbundy.com

Laura Ashley Bell Bundy-Hinkle (born April 10, 1981) is an American actress and singer-songwriter. Her career started as a child, when her mother entered her in beauty pageants, where she would sing as a talent. After recognizing her singing ability, her mother took her to New York City, where she found success as a child actress and model, signing with Ford Modeling Agency in 1986. She was cast as the lead in Ruthless! at age 9 in 1991. She later gained wider recognition for her role as the young Sarah Whittle in 1995's Jumanji. Later she played Marah Lewis on the daytime soap Guiding Light from 1999 to 2001.

She is best known for originating the Broadway roles of Amber Von Tussle in the musical version of Hairspray and Elle Woods in the musical version of Legally Blonde in 2007, for which she was nominated for a Tony Award. In 2010 she signed to Mercury Records Nashville and released her two country music singles, "Giddy On Up" and "Drop on By". Bundy is a co-founder of Womxn of Tomorrow, a foundation that supports and encourages women and women's rights. In 2023, she returned to Broadway, starring in The Cottage.

== Early life ==
Laura Ashley Bell Bundy was born on April 10, 1981, in Euclid, Ohio, and raised in Lexington, Kentucky. Her mother, Lorna Bundy-Jones (née Lorna Ann Bell), is a Lancome Beauty Advisor at Ulta, and her father, Don Bundy, was an electrical engineer. Her parents divorced in 1997 when she was 16 years old; both later remarried. Her father died in 2018. She took dance lessons at Town and Village School of Dance in Paris, Kentucky. When she was nine, she appeared in the Radio City Christmas Spectacular in New York City. Finding success on stage, she auditioned for roles in Les Misérables and The Will Rogers Follies before landing the lead role in Ruthless!.

In 1991, she moved to New York and attended the Professional Children's School while performing in Ruthless!. Five years later she moved back to Kentucky and graduated from Lexington Catholic High School. She is the niece of Marcia Malone Bell, Miss Kentucky 1978 and 1979 Top Ten Miss America semifinalist. Bell Bundy was diagnosed with celiac disease when she was about 18 years old. In 1995, at the age of 14, Bell Bundy appeared in the film Jumanji, playing the younger version of Bonnie Hunt's character, Sarah Whittle. During this time she began writing songs. Her first band was formed at the age of 18. While performing in Hairspray, she enrolled in NYU as a sociology major, but did not graduate.

== Career ==
=== Stage ===
Bell Bundy originated the role of Tina Denmark in Ruthless! The Musical which opened Off-Broadway in 1992. For this role, she was nominated for a 1993 Drama Desk Award and Outer Critics Circle Award for Outstanding Actress in a Musical. In 2002, at the age of 21, she made her Broadway debut in the musical Hairspray, originating the role of Amber Von Tussle. Amber is a bratty, selfish resident princess of The Corny Collins Show. Bell Bundy was next a Glinda standby for Kristin Chenoweth in Wicked. She starred as Sherrie Christian in the jukebox musical Rock of Ages in Los Angeles.

From 2007 to July 2008, she starred on Broadway in Legally Blonde: The Musical where she originated the lead role of Elle Woods. Elle is a sorority sister, president of the Delta Nu who finds herself at Harvard University studying to become a lawyer. For this role she received her first Tony Award nomination for Best Leading Actress in a Musical.

Her theatre credits outside of New York City include the national tour of The Sound of Music with Marie Osmond and Gypsy with Betty Buckley and Deborah Gibson at the Paper Mill Playhouse in Millburn, New Jersey (1998).

Bell Bundy reprised the role of Elle Woods in the U.S. national tour of Legally Blonde: The Musical as a temporary replacement for the injured Becky Gulsvig, alongside Lauren Zakrin. Bell Bundy began her brief run on January 13, 2009, and ended on February 22, 2009. She would go on to play Elle again during the Nashville engagement of the national tour from June 23–28, 2009. However, she fractured her arm during the June 27, 2009 performance, finished the show, and was rushed to the hospital immediately after.

On September 27, 2008, she participated in a benefit concert for Anaheim, California's the Chance Theatre with fellow Wicked alum Eden Espinosa and with Spring Awakening alum Lea Michele for the Broadway Chance Style: Up Close and Personal concert.

On June 13, 2010, she was a presenter at the 64th Tony Awards ceremony.

She appeared as Trixie Norton in a new musical The Honeymooners, based on the television comedy The Honeymooners. Trixie Norton is a former burlesque dancer and wife of Ed Norton, who wants to get back into show business. The musical premiered at the Paper Mill Playhouse in Milburn, New Jersey on September 28, 2017, running through October 29. Directed by John Rando, the musical also starred Michael McGrath as Ralph Kramden, Michael Mastro as Ed Norton, and Leslie Kritzer as Alice Kramden.

Bell Bundy appeared in the lead role of Sweet Charity staged and directed by Kathleen Marshall in June 2018 in Los Angeles. She returned to Broadway in the 2023 play The Cottage, which ran at the Hayes Theater from July through October 2023.

=== Film and television ===
Bell Bundy has appeared in films including The Adventures of Huck Finn (1993), Life with Mikey (1993), and Jumanji (1995) as Young Sarah Whittle. In 1999, she debuted in the role of rebellious daughter Marah Lewis on the CBS daytime soap opera Guiding Light and playing the character until 2001. She appeared in the 2006 film adaptation of Dreamgirls.

Bell Bundy was a judge at the Miss America 2009 pageant.

She had a recurring role on the sixth season of CBS's How I Met Your Mother as Becky, a hyperactive, obnoxious girl and Robin's co-anchor. She reprised the role in the spinoff, How I Met Your Father.

Bell Bundy had a recurring role as Shelby on The CW's Hart of Dixie from 2012 until 2015. Shelby is the newcomer in town who was introduced as a love interest for George Tucker, however, later begins a relationship with Brick.

She starred as Dr. Jordan Denby on the FX sitcom Anger Management in 2013. She's a new psychologist, business partner for Charlie and alcoholic, who attends Alcoholics Anonymous. Bell Bundy also played Jordan's twin sister, Jessie.

In 2015, she starred in Becoming Santa, a Lifetime TV movie with Michael Gross and Meredith Baxter.

She starred as Rachel Raskin on The Fairly OddParents: Fairly Odder, a live action sequel series to The Fairly OddParents, which premiered March 31, 2022 on Paramount+.

=== Country music ===
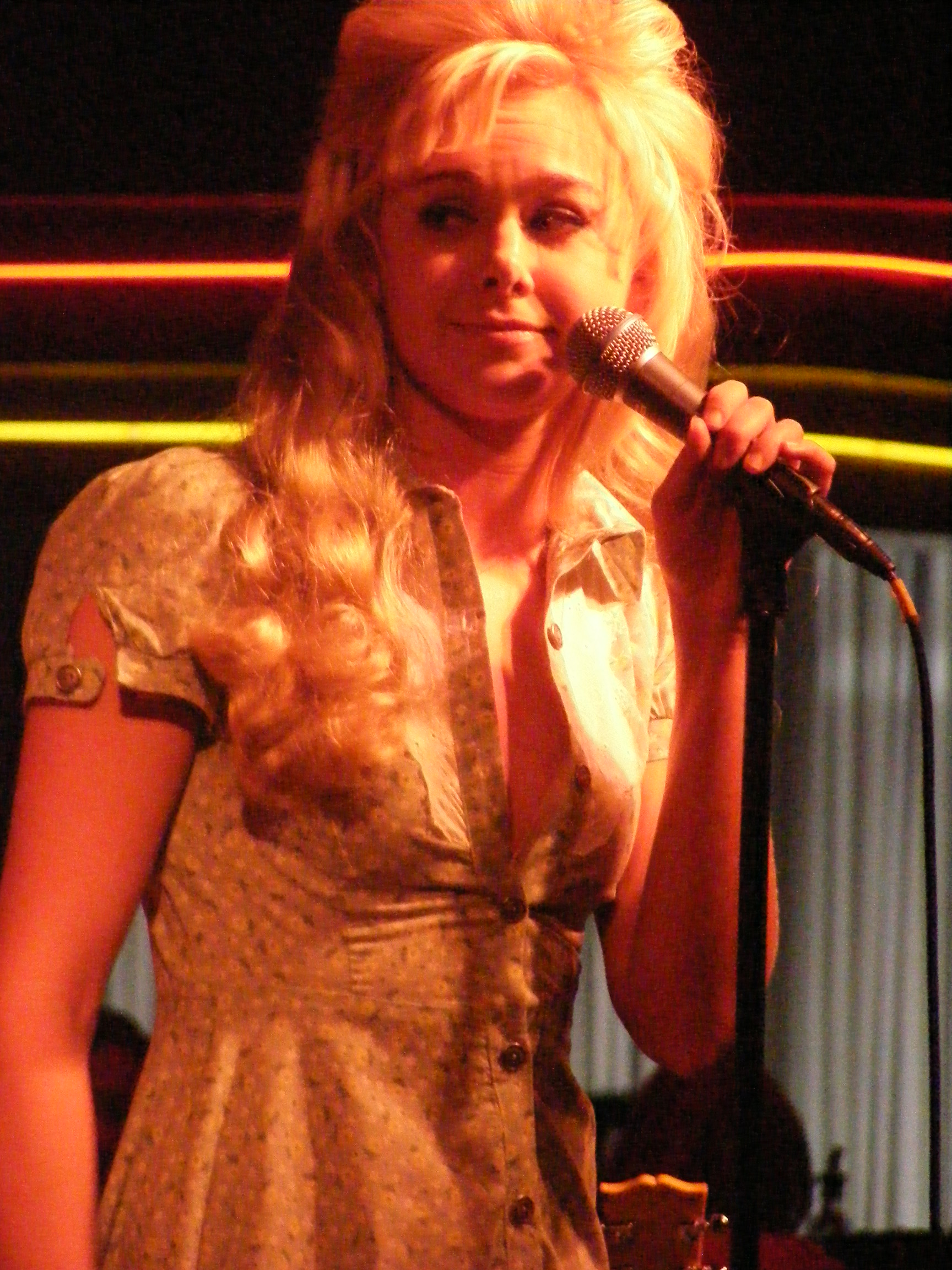
Bell Bundy at Birdland in July 2007

Bell Bundy released her debut country music album, titled Longing For a Place Already Gone, in 2007.

After leaving Legally Blonde: The Musical in July 2008, she moved back to Nashville to work on her second album, Achin' and Shakin'. Achin' and Shakin' was released on April 13, 2010. It debuted at number 5 on the Billboard Top Country Albums chart as well as number 28 on the all-genre Billboard 200. As of June 26, 2010, the album has sold over 70,000 copies in the United States. It also charted internationally, where it reached number 34 on the Norwegian Albums Chart. Her two songs "Giddy On Up" and "Rebound" was featured on the video game series Rock Band. Bell Bundy also appeared in fellow country artist Miranda Lambert's music video for "Only Prettier," as one of Lambert's friends alongside Kellie Pickler and Hillary Scott of Lady Antebellum. Bell Bundy began as the spokesperson for the Selected Chevrolet Dealers of Middle Tennessee in September 2011. Bell Bundy released a new single, "That's What Angels Do", in 2012.

In mid-2013, she signed with Big Machine Records and released the single "Two Step", a duet with Colt Ford. This song was peaked at number 59 on the US Country Airplay. Her third album Another Piece of Me was digitally released in June 2015.

=== Director ===
In July 2017, Bell Bundy co-directed Lexington Theatre Company production of Legally Blonde: The Musical at Lexington Opera House. On November 12, 2017, she directed a concert of Double Standards at The Town Hall.

In 2018, she wrote and directed music videos for a Barefoot Wine campaign.

She also directed several sketches and music videos, includes parodies and covers of hit songs. Her most well-known sketch comedy web series is a Cooter County and Skits-O-Frenic.

=== Podcasts and Women of Tomorrow ===
On October 5, 2020, she and music producer Shea Carter launched their podcast Women of Tomorrow, an extension of their album of the same name that allows "Bundy and Carter to dive deep into [the issues of women's rights] that were so hard-fought."

Her fourth album Women of Tomorrow was released in May 2021. This album was received well by critics and it has over 1 million streams on Spotify and other streaming services.

Bell Bundy has been a guest on many podcasts to promote the podcast and album, one of the most notable being The Theatre Podcast with Alan Seales.

== Personal life ==
In December 2015, she announced her engagement to TBS executive Thom Hinkle after four years of dating. They were married on June 3, 2017, in Arcadia, California. On February 25, 2019, she announced that she was pregnant with her first child. Their son was born in May 2019.

Bell Bundy is an activist focused on women's rights and equality. She is the founder of Double Standards Organization and Womxn of Tomorrow.

== Discography ==
=== Studio albums ===
Title	Album details	Peak chart positions		
Title	Album details	US Country	US	NOR
Longing for a Place Already Gone	Release date: June 5, 2007; Label: The LAB Records; Formats: CD, music download	—	—	—
I'll Be Home for Christmas	Release date: June 4, 2007; Label: The LAB Records; Formats: CD	—	—	—
Achin' and Shakin'	Release date: April 13, 2010; Label: Mercury Nashville; Formats: CD, music download	5	28	34
Live at Jazzfest 2013	Release date: Label: Homegrown Music Network/MRI; Formats: CD	—	—	—
Another Piece of Me	Release date: June 9, 2015; Label: Big Machine Records; Formats: Music download	—	—	—
Women of Tomorrow	Release date: 2021; Label: ONErpm; Formats: Music download	—	—	—
"—" denotes releases that did not chart

=== Singles ===
Year	Single	Peak chart positions				Album
Year	Single	US Country	US Country Airplay	US Bubbling	US Dance	Album
2010	"Giddy On Up"	31	—	7	43	Achin' and Shakin'
2010	"Drop On By"	48	—	—	—	Achin' and Shakin'
2012	"That's What Angels Do"	—	—	—	—	Another Piece of Me
2013	"Two Step"	—	59	—	—	Another Piece of Me
2020	"Get It Girl, You Go" (with Shoshana Bean and Anika Noni Rose)	—	—	—	—	Women of Tomorrow
"—" denotes releases that did not chart

=== Cast recordings and soundtracks ===
- Hairspray - Original Broadway Cast Recording (2003)
- Dreamgirls - Original Motion Picture Soundtrack (2006)
- Legally Blonde - Original Broadway Cast Recording (2008)
- Pure Country: Pure Heart - Original Motion Picture Soundtrack (2017)

=== Other recordings ===
- Featured on Guiding Light - "I Believe in the Mystery", 2002
- Featured on NEO: New, Emerging, Outstanding - "Any Day", duet with Kerry Butler, 2005
- Featured on New York Cares About Local Music - "Goodbye Yesterday", duet with Amber Rhodes, 2006
- Featured on Declaration of Independence - "Hugh Damn Right", duet with Colt Ford, 2012
- Featured on In the Spirit: A Celebration of the Holidays - "Baby, It's Cold Outside", with John Driskell Hopkins & Atlanta Pops Orchestra, 2015
- Featured on Saloons on Neptune - "Take a Shot", duet with Cowboy Troy, 2015

=== Music videos ===
Year	Video	Director
2010	"Giddy On Up"	Shane Drake
2010	"Drop On By"	Kristin Barlowe
2012	"That's What Angels Do"	Laura Bell Bundy/Becky Fluke
2013	"Two Step" (with Colt Ford)	Laura Bell Bundy/Becky Fluke
2013	"Kentucky Dirty"	Laura Bell Bundy/Becky Fluke
2015	"I Am What I Am"	Becky Fluke
2017	"You Can't Pray the Gay Away"	Laura Bell Bundy
2020	"Get It Girl, You Go" (with Shoshana Bean and Anika Noni Rose)	Laura Bell Bundy/Shea Carter/Jeremy Adelman
2020	"Girls Just Want To Have Fun"	Ariel Zucker
2021	"American Girl" (with Shea Carter)	Laura Bell Bundy
2021	"Money Ho (Let’s Get Down To Business)"	Laura Bell Bundy/Shea Carter/Jeremy Adelman

== Filmography ==
=== Film ===
Year	Title	Role	Notes
1993	The Adventures of Huck Finn	Susan Wilks	as Laura Bundy
1993	Life with Mikey	Courtney Aspinall	as Laura Bundy
1995	Jumanji	Young Sarah Whittle	
2006	Surf School	Doris	
2006	Dreamgirls	Sweetheart	
2008	The Drum Beats Twice	Peggy	as Laura Bundy
2013	Watercolor Postcards	Sunny	
2015	Becoming Santa	Holly	
2016	After the Reality	Kelly	
2017	Pure Country: Pure Heart	Marq Dunn	Direct-to-video
2017	Beauty Mark	Lorraine	
2022	Snow Day	Linda Brandston	
2026	Influenced	Blagdanorova Hammerman	

=== Television ===
Year	Title	Role	Notes
1996	Home Improvement	Sharon	Episode: "Mrs. Wilson's Opus"
1999	Strangers with Candy	Kimberly Timothy	Pilot episode, unaired
1999–2001	Guiding Light	Marah Lewis	Series regular
2003	All Grown Up	Brenda	Television film
2005	Veronica Mars	Julie Bloch	Episode: "Green-Eyed Monster"
2006	Dirtbags	Meg	Television film
2006	Cold Case	Nora McCarthy	Episode: "Willkommen"
2006	Modern Men	Tyffani	Episode: "The Homewrecker"
2008	Happy Hour	Alicia	Episode: "Thanksgiving"
2010–14	How I Met Your Mother	Becky	5 episodes
2010	Kathy Griffin: My Life on the D-List	Herself	Episode: "Maggie, the Musical"
2011	Trailer Trash	Peggy Sue	Unsold television film
2011	Hound Dogs	Ginger Ledoux	Television film
2011	To the Mat	Janice	Television film
2012–15	Hart of Dixie	Shelby	24 episodes
2013	Malibu Country	Shauna	Episode: "Adventures in Babysitting"
2013	Royal Pains	Gina Black	Episode: "A Trimus Story"
2013	Dear Dumb Diary	Aunt Carol	Television film
2013–14	Anger Management	Dr. Jordan Denby	53 episodes
2015	Becoming Santa	Holly Claus	Television film
2016	Almost Royal	Herself	Episode: "The Great Outdoors"
2016	Angie Tribeca	Vivian Tribeca	Episode: "Murder in the First Class"
2016	Scream Queens	Nurse Thomas	3 episodes
2016	Documentary Now!	Bridget Bailey	Episode: "Mr. Runner Up: My Life as an Oscar Bridesmaid"
2016	Fuller House	Ginger Gladstone	Episode: "Fuller Thanksgiving"
2016	Season's Greetings	Darcy Blake	Television film
2017	Liv and Maddie	Tracey Okahatchee	Episode: "Voice-A-Rooney"
2017	The Christmas Calendar	Emily	Canadian television film
2019	American Gods	Columbia	Episode: "Donar the Great"
2019–20	Perfect Harmony	Kimmy Bell	3 episodes
2020	AJ and the Queen	Bernadette Anderson	Episode: "Mt. Juliet"
2021	Family Guy	Holly, Miss Laura	Voice, 2 episodes: "Boy's Best Friend," "Young Parent Trap"
2022	How I Met Your Father	Becky	2 episodes
2022	The Fairly OddParents: Fairly Odder	Rachel Raskin	Main role
2022	Call Me Kat	Nicole	3 episodes
2022	Snow Day	Linda Brandston	Television film

== Theatre ==
Year	Title	Role	Notes
1992–1993	Ruthless!	Tina Denmark	Off-Broadway – The Players Theatre
1993–1995	The Sound of Music	Louisa von Trapp/ Brigitta von Trapp (Understudy)	U.S. National Tour
1998	Gypsy	June Hovick	Regional – Paper Mill Playhouse
2002–2003	Hairspray	Amber Von Tussle	Regional – 5th Avenue Theatre; Broadway – Neil Simon Theatre
2003–2004	Wicked	Glinda (standby)	Broadway – George Gershwin Theatre
2004	Tarzan	Jane Porter	New York Theatre Workshop
2005–2006	Rock of Ages	Sherrie Christian	Regional – King King (Los Angeles, CA); Regional – The Vanguard (Hollywood, CA)
2007–2008	Legally Blonde	Elle Woods	Out-of-town tryout – Golden Gate Theatre; Broadway – Palace Theatre
2008	The 24 Hour Plays 2008	Singer	Broadway – American Airlines Theatre
2009	Legally Blonde	Elle Woods (replacement)	U.S. National Tour
2017	The Honeymooners	Trixie Norton	Regional – Paper Mill Playhouse
2018	Sweet Charity	Charity Hope Valentine	Regional – UCLA Freud Playhouse
2023	The Cottage	Sylvia Van Kipness	Broadway - Helen Hayes Theater
2025	Romy & Michele: The Musical	Romy White	Off-Broadway - Stage 42

=== Demo readings ===
- Blood Drive
- But I'm a Cheerleader
- Hairspray

== Awards and nominations ==
Year	Award	Category	Work	Result	Ref.
1993	Drama Desk Award	Outstanding Actress in a Musical	Ruthless!	Nominated	
1993	Outer Critics Circle Award	Outstanding Actress in a Musical	Ruthless!	Nominated	
2007	Tony Award	Best Actress in a Musical	Legally Blonde	Nominated	
2007	Drama Desk Award	Outstanding Actress in a Musical	Legally Blonde	Nominated	
2007	Drama League Award	Distinguished Performance	Legally Blonde	Nominated	
2007	Broadway.com Audience Choice Awards	Favorite Leading Actress in a Musical	Legally Blonde	Nominated	
2007	Broadway.com Audience Choice Awards	Favorite Diva Performance	Legally Blonde	Nominated	
2007	Broadway.com Audience Choice Awards	Favorite Onstage Pair (with Christian Borle)	Legally Blonde	Nominated	
2010	American Country Award	Music Video Breakthrough Artist	Giddy On Up	Nominated	
2010	CMT Music Award	Breakthrough Video of the Year	Giddy On Up	Nominated	
2018	Ovation Awards	Lead Actress in a Musical	Sweet Charity	Nominated	
2021	Five Continents International Film Festival	Best Team Performance Feature Film	Red Pill	Won	
2024	Broadway.com Audience Awards	Favorite Leading Actress in a Play	The Cottage	Nominated	
