= We've Never Heard of You Either =

Studio album by Evan and Jaron
- Released: April 21, 1998
- Length: 49:07
- Label: Island
- Producer: Danny Kortchmar

Evan and Jaron chronology
Not from Concentrate (1996)	We've Never Heard of You Either (1998)	Evan and Jaron (2000)

Professional ratings
Review scores
Source	Rating
AllMusic	3/5 stars
The Encyclopedia of Popular Music	3/5 stars

We've Never Heard of You Either is the first major label album by Evan and Jaron, released on Island Records in 1998.

Despite the patronage of Jimmy Buffett, the album was unsuccessful. The duo was dropped from Island two months after the album was released.

== Critical reception ==
AllMusic wrote that the album "shows further growth in the boys as songwriters and singers; they just haven't yet reached that crucial point of equipoise."

== Track listing ==
1. "There You Are Again" – 2:55
2. "And Then She Says" – 3:09
3. "South of Tennessee" – 5:24
4. "Andy Warhol (3:59 of Fame)" – 4:04
5. "Could've Been James Dean" – 4:45
6. "Nothing and Everything" – 4:14
7. "Couldn't Care Less About" – 6:06
8. "How to Keep the Sky from Falling" – 2:57
9. "Is It All That Great Without Me" – 3:39
10. "Show You Sometime" – 3:28
11. "Like the Rain" – 4:35
12. "Close My Eyes" – 3:51
