= Sykamore =

Canadian country music singer-songwriter

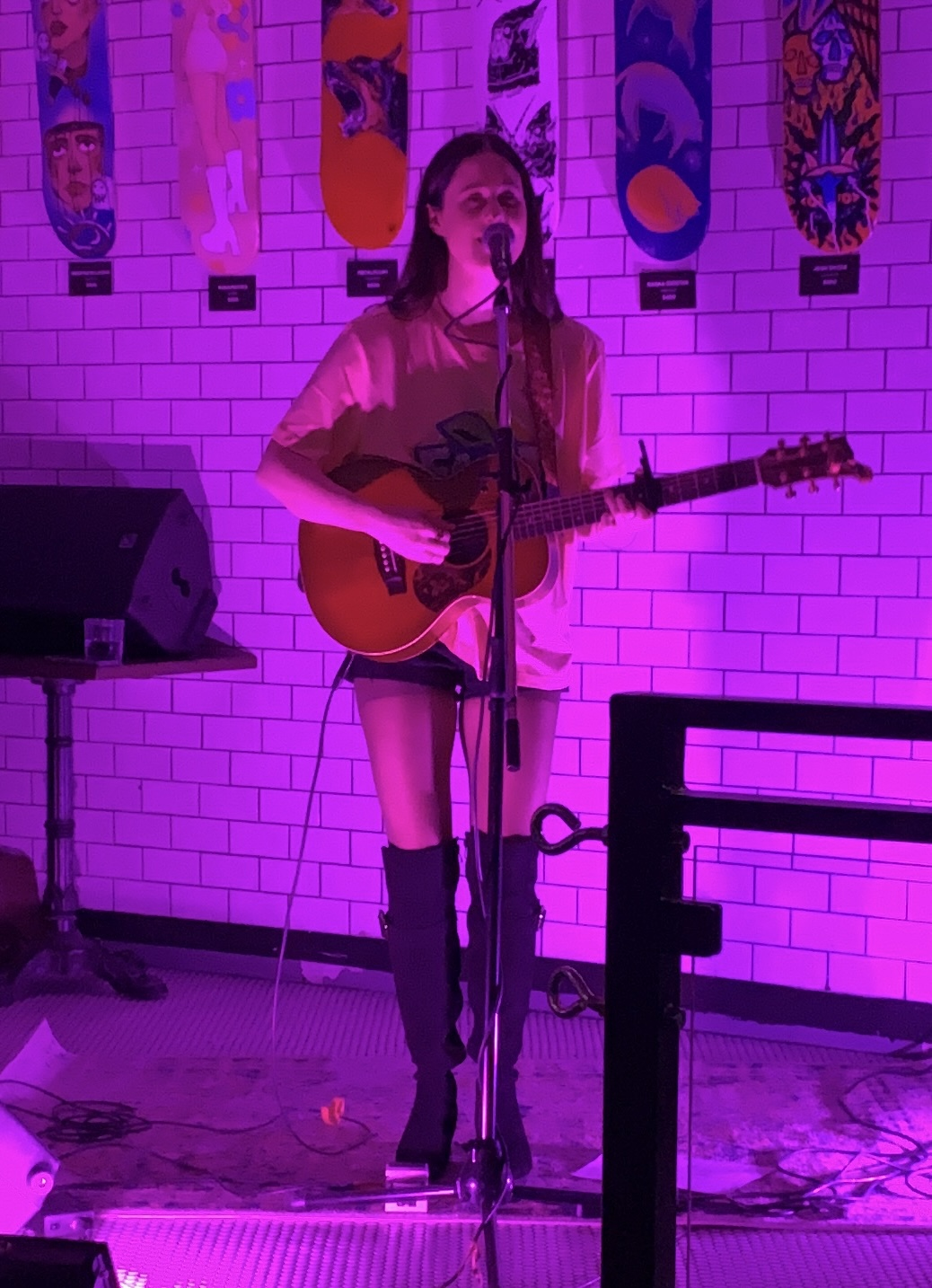
- Sykamore performing in Toronto, Ontario, in June 2023

Background information
- Born: Jordan Ostrom; Carseland, Alberta, Canada
- Genres: Country; Country pop; folk-pop
- Occupations: Musician; singer-songwriter
- Instruments: Vocals, guitar, piano, ukulele
- Years active: 2013–present
- Labels: Music Knox Records; BMG; Road Angel; Warner Music Canada
- Website: Official website

Jordan Ostrom, known professionally as Sykamore, is a country singer-songwriter from Carseland, Alberta, Canada. She released her first EP, Self + Medicine, in January 2018. In 2015 she was nominated for the Canadian Country Music Association Discovery Award. Her debut album Pinto was released in 2022.

== Biography ==
Raised on her family's ranch outside Calgary, Ostrom grew up listening to country artists such as George Strait, The Dixie Chicks, and Alan Jackson.

At the onset of her musical career, she made the decision to perform under a stage name. She stated "My real name is not a secret but I decided to take on another name mostly because I feel that my real name is not that memorable...I started thinking about titles that would reflect my music and I was thinking about how I would describe it and it was all very rootsy and tenacious and organic and it all lent itself to this sort of tree flavour and I thought, well maybe there's a tree name that would help us with titling this thing. And, honestly, sycamore was one of the first that I looked at and thought it was cool."

Sykamore received first prize in the ATB Financial All-Albertan Songwriting contest, with her original song, "Heaven in the Pines." Her song I Can Make You Happy was featured on Season 8 of the Canadian television series Heartland. In 2015 she was nominated for the Canadian Country Music Association Discovery Award.

In 2017, Sykamore signed with Home Team Publishing in Nashville after being discovered on Twitter by Rhett Akins, one of the company's co-founders along with his son Thomas Rhett. Reflecting on how he discovered Sykamore, Akins said, "I read her name, I was curious...I saw her face, I was intrigued...I heard her voice, I was done." On 19 June 2019 it was announced that Sykamore had signed a record deal with Music Knox Records, a joint venture between producer Michael Knox and Broken Bow Records/BMG. Sykamore was the first artist to sign with the label partnership. In an article in Music Row Magazine, Knox was quoted as saying, "We couldn’t be prouder to have her as our first signing. When I first heard Sykamore, her voice grabbed my attention immediately. Being a song guy, when I found out that she was a writer on everything I was hearing, it was a no brainer for me."

On 3 April 2020 Sykamore released California King on Music Knox Records/Wheelhouse Records/BMG. Writing in American Songwriter, journalist Joe Vitagliano described the EP as "a five song breeze which is as relatable and funny as it is intimate and personal." Parade Magazine published an article about the first track on the collection, "Record High," where Laura B. Whitmore wrote, "Free-spirited and dance-inducing, “Record High," the new single by Nashville artist Sykamore, is a tune to lift your mood and prepare you to take on the world. With a twangy twist of country and pop, "Record High" is a soaring, morning shower sing-along anthem to take on the day." In various interviews promoting the release, including one with the Calgary Herald, Sykamore hinted a full length album, that will include the songs from the EP, was on the horizon.

On 2 May 2020, Sykamore contributed an article to Variety about the effect the COVID-19 pandemic had on her career and personal life. "I decided to release new music during this weird time — though it was a scary decision to make. Trying to promote a five-song EP during the biggest economic upset in 100 years is uncharted territory. In some respects, the term 'the show must go on' has taken on a whole new meaning. We are living in a 'new normal' — one that involves a lot of 'making the best of it.'" She continued, "I’ve uncovered a surprising truth: the world is smaller. This virus has forced us as a planet to completely unite...I used to see life in five-year plans. Nowadays, it’s in days — even hours. I go for walks, I promote my ‘California King’ EP on Instagram live, and I make turkey chili. I find things I CAN do in a sea of things I have no control over."

Sykamore wrote and sang with Ryan Kinder on "Doing Fine" from his planned collaborations album called Ontology. The track was released digitally on 16 October 2020. Critic Robert Oermann wrote in Music Row Magazine, "This is a fiery male-female duet performance that builds in intensity as it unspools. One person can’t move on if the other person doesn’t hurt as badly. I have always liked this guy’s singing, and he’s just as potent with a harmony partner. Sykamore was discovered and brought to Nashville by Rhett Akins. She’s a winner, and this is definitely worth your spins." A music video for the song premiered on CMT 1 December 2020.

On 4 December 2020, Sykamore released her version of the holiday song "What Are You Doing New Year's Eve."

In August 2022, Sykamore independently released her debut album Pinto. The album was nominated for Album of the Year at the 2023 Country Music Alberta Awards.

== Discography ==
=== Studio albums ===
Title	Details
Pinto	Release date: 12 August 2022; Label: Independent; Format: CD, Digital Download, Streaming

=== Extended plays ===
Title	Details
Self Help + Medicine	Release date: 5 January 2018; Label: Road Angel Entertainment / Warner Music Canada; Format: CD, Digital Download, streaming
California King	Release date: 3 April 2020; Label: Music Knox Records / Wheelhouse Records; Format: Digital Download, streaming
Through the Static	Release date: 29 March 2024; Label: Independent; Format: Digital download, streaming

=== Singles ===
Title	Year	Album
"Houseboat"	2016	Self Help + Medicine
"Better Half"	2017	Self Help + Medicine
"Pinto"	2022	Pinto
"Dancing in the Dark"	2023	Pinto
"Highway Towns"	2024	Through the Static

==== Promotional singles ====
Title	Year
"Record High"	2020
"What Are You Doing New Year's Eve?"	2020
"Cheap Thrills"	2021
"Stay Broke"	2021
"Go Easy on Me"	2021
"Just 4 July"	2022
"Emotional"	2024

==== As featured artist ====
Title	Year
"Doing Fine" (Ryan Kinder featuring Sykamore)	2020

== Awards and nominations ==
Year	Association	Category	Nominated work	Result	Ref.
2023	Country Music Alberta	Album of the Year	Pinto	Nominated	
