= Evan and Jaron =

American musical duo

- Origin: Tucker, Georgia, U.S.
- Genres: Pop rock, indie rock, alternative rock, power pop
- Labels: Island, Columbia
- Members: Evan Lowenstein; Jaron Lowenstein

Evan Mitchell Lowenstein and Jaron David Lowenstein (born March 18, 1974) are American musicians and identical twin brothers who performed as Evan and Jaron. They are best known for their 2000 single "Crazy for This Girl", which peaked at number 15 on the Billboard Hot 100. Evan and Jaron have recorded three studio albums.

== Early lives and family ==
Evan and Jaron Lowenstein grew up in Tucker, Georgia. They are identical twins, born March 18, 1974. Their parents are Leslie (Diamond) and Charles Lowenstein. The duo were raised in an Orthodox Jewish family, and attended Greenfield Hebrew Academy and Yeshiva High School (which have since merged to form the Atlanta Jewish Academy). Through their mother, they are related (by marriage) to actor Logan Lerman.

== Music career ==
Evan and Jaron began performing in the folk-pop genre in coffee houses in their hometown of Atlanta. In 1994, their live album, Live at KaLo's Coffee House was released. After touring for a year, Evan and Jaron released a second independent album, Not from Concentrate (1996) and performed at the 1996 Atlanta Olympics. While touring, they were noticed by Jimmy Buffett, who signed them to Island Records. Island released the album We've Never Heard of You Either in 1998.

In 2000, the duo released Evan and Jaron for Columbia Records. The album included the top 40 singles "Crazy for This Girl", "From My Head to My Heart", and "The Distance". With the benefit of heavy publicity from Columbia, "Crazy for This Girl" peaked at No. 15 and was included on the soundtrack of the Dawson's Creek television series; the single has become Evan and Jaron's "signature song".

Evan and Jaron released Half Dozen in 2004. According to Jaron, the duo was dropped by Columbia Records. The brothers then pursued other ventures.

In March 2006, the pair appeared on ABC's reality TV show American Inventor, showcasing their company Pit Port. Pit Port is a container for discarded seeds and pits in various fruits and nuts.

== Other activities ==
Jaron Lowenstein released a solo single, "Pray for You", credited to Jaron and the Long Road to Love, to country radio in November 2009. The song reached the top 20 on the Hot Country Songs charts, and the top 40 of the Billboard Hot 100. Jaron released his debut album, Getting Dressed in the Dark, on June 22, 2010. The album debuted at #2 on the Billboard Top Country Albums chart selling 23,916 copies in its first week.

As of 2026, Jaron Lowenstein, through The Lowenstein Company, a talent management company, is manager and business partner for Sam Harris, and Lowenstein appears regularly on Harris's Making Sense podcast opposite Harris, prompting Harris to speak about politics and current events.

In 2019, a Hollywood Reporter article stated that Evan Lowenstein had become Kevin Spacey's manager in 2016.

== Discography ==
=== Studio albums ===
Title	Album details	Peak chart positions	
Title	Album details	US	US Heat
Not from Concentrate	Release date: 1996; Label: A Major Label Records; Formats: CD	—	—
We've Never Heard of You Either	Release date: April 21, 1998; Label: Island Records; Formats: CD, cassette	—	—
Evan and Jaron	Release date: September 5, 2000; Label: Columbia Records; Formats: CD, cassette	156	4
Half Dozen	Release date: April 13, 2004; Label: 12 Between Us; Formats: CD, music download	—	—
"—" denotes releases that did not chart

=== Live albums ===
Title	Album details
Live at KaLo's Coffee House	Release date: June 20, 1995; Label: Durable Phig Leaf; Formats: CD, cassette

=== Singles ===
Year	Single	Peak chart positions				Album
Year	Single	US Hot 100	US Mainstream	US Adult	US AC	Album
1998	"And Then She Says"	—	—	—	—	We've Never Heard of You Either
2000	"Crazy for This Girl"	15	9	4	27	Evan and Jaron
2001	"From My Head to My Heart"	124	35	28	—	Evan and Jaron
2001	"The Distance"	108	31	—	—	Evan and Jaron
"—" denotes releases that did not chart

== Notes ==
- A "From My Head to My Heart" did not enter the Billboard Hot 100, but peaked at number 24 on the Bubbling Under Hot 100 Singles chart, which acts as a 25-song extension to the Hot 100.
- B "The Distance" did not enter the Billboard Hot 100, but peaked at number 8 on the Bubbling Under Hot 100 Singles chart, which acts as a 25-song extension to the Hot 100.
