= S.O.S.: Save Our Soul =

Studio album by Marc Broussard
- Released: June 26, 2007
- Studio: GroundStar Laboratories, Ocean Way Recording and The Insanery (Nashville, Tennessee)
- Genre: R&B
- Label: Vanguard Records
- Producer: Justin Tocket: Calvin Turner

Marc Broussard chronology
Carencro (2004)	S.O.S.: Save Our Soul (2007)	Keep Coming Back (2008)

Professional ratings
Review scores
Source	Rating
Music Box	2.5/5 stars

S.O.S.: Save Our Soul is the third studio album by Marc Broussard on Vanguard Records. The album features just one original song, "Come In From The Cold," with cover songs making up the rest of the album. It debuted and peaked at #96 on the Billboard 200 albums chart, making it his first album to reach the top 100.

As of July 11, 2007, it has sold 12,771 copies in the US.

== Track listing ==
1. "You Met Your Match" (originally by Stevie Wonder) – 2:39
2. "If I Could Build My Whole World Around You" (originally by Marvin Gaye and Tammi Terrell) – 2:18
3. "Harry Hippie" (originally by Bobby Womack) – 3:53
4. "Let The Music Get Down In Your Soul" (originally by Rance Allen) – 3:50
5. "I Love You More Than You'll Ever Know" (originally by Blood, Sweat & Tears) – 5:09
6. "Inner City Blues (Make Me Wanna Holler)" (originally by Marvin Gaye) – 5:14
7. "Love and Happiness" (originally by Al Green) – 4:38
8. "I've Been Loving You Too Long" (originally by Otis Redding) – 2:50
9. "Respect Yourself" (originally by The Staple Singers) – 4:29
10. "Yes We Can, Can" (originally by The Pointer Sisters) – 4:38
11. "Come In From The Cold" (Marc Broussard, Radney Foster, Justin Tocket) – 3:50
12. "Bring It On Home To Me" (originally by Sam Cooke) (iTunes/Borders Exclusive Bonus Track)
13. "Kissing My Love" (originally by Bill Withers) (Circuit City Exclusive Bonus Track)

== Personnel ==
- Marc Broussard – vocals
- De Marco Johnson – clavinet (1, 10), acoustic piano (2, 4–6, 8), organ (3, 7, 10, 11),Wurlitzer electric piano (3, 9, 10), Fender Rhodes (5, 11)
- Shannon Sanders – organ (4, 5)
- Akil Thompson – guitars (1, 3–11), acoustic guitars (2), electric guitars (2)
- Andrew Ramsey – banjitar (3)
- Eric Krasno – guitars (5)
- Calvin Turner – bass, percussion, vibraphone, horn arrangements, string arrangements, backing vocals (1, 4, 10)
- Chad Gilmore – drums, percussion
- Jon Jackson – alto saxophone, tenor saxophone
- Jeff Coffin – baritone saxophone, tenor saxophone, flute (6)
- Chris Dunn – trombone
- Jon-Paul Frappier – trumpet, flugelhorn
- Reggie Grisham – trumpet, flugelhorn
- John Catchings – cello
- Kristin Wilkinson – viola
- David Angell – violin
- David Davidson – violin
- Pamela Sixfin – violin
- David Ryan Harris – backing vocals (1), co-lead vocals (6)
- Toby Lightman – co-lead vocals (2), backing vocals (3, 7, 9, 10)
- Nickie Conley – backing vocals (3, 7, 9, 10), co-lead vocals (9)
- Ian Fitchuk – backing vocals (3, 10)
- Ashley Jett – backing vocals (3, 7, 9, 10)

=== Production ===
- Calvin Turner – producer
- Justin Tocket – producer, recording, mixing
- Casey Wood – additional recording
- Joe Martino – additional recording, assistant engineer
- Leslie Richter – assistant engineer
- Arik Abel – production coordinator
- Alex McKinney – web design
- Amy L. Von Holzhausen – layout
- Sam Erickson – photography
- Adrian Miller – additional photography

== Singles ==
'Love and Happiness' was the first single released off the album.

'Come In From The Cold' was the second single released from the album. It is Marc's first single to have become successful overseas.
