= Jaron Lowenstein =

American singer (born 1974)

- Also known as: Jaron and the Long Road to Love
- Born: Jaron David Lowenstein; March 18, 1974 (age 52)
- Origin: Tucker, Georgia, U.S.
- Genre: Country pop
- Years active: 1994–present
- Labels: Jaronwood; Universal Republic Records; Big Machine; Republic Nashville; Nine North
- Formerly of: Evan and Jaron

Jaron David Lowenstein (born March 18, 1974) is an American singer who formerly recorded with his identical twin brother, Evan, in the musical duo Evan and Jaron. As Jaron and the Long Road to Love, he released his debut single, "Pray for You" to country radio in November 2009. This song reached the top 15 on the Billboard Hot Country Songs charts, and is included on the album Getting Dressed in the Dark. The second single, "That's Beautiful to Me", was released in September 2010.

== Life and career ==
Lowenstein was born in Tucker, Georgia, the son of Leslie (née Diamond) and Charles Lowenstein. He was raised in an Orthodox Jewish family, and attended Greenfield Hebrew Academy and Yeshiva High School (which have since merged to form the Atlanta Jewish Academy) Through his mother, he is related (by marriage) to actor Logan Lerman. In the late 1990s and early 2000s, Lowenstein recorded with his identical twin brother, Evan, in the pop duo Evan and Jaron. Evan and Jaron charted three singles, including "Crazy for This Girl," which reached number 15 on the Billboard Hot 100 charts in 2000. The duo split up in 2003 so that Evan could focus on raising his family.

Jaron co-wrote and recorded his first solo single, "Pray for You", as Jaron and the Long Road to Love in late 2009. Starting in February 2010, Big Machine Records assumed promotion of the single and a forthcoming album, which was distributed through a partnership of Jaron's Jaronwood label and Universal Republic. The song reached the top 40 on the Billboard Hot Country Songs chart and the Billboard Hot 100.

Jaron told Technorati that the song "wasn't started or pushed by some major label or organization. I would love to take the credit for its success, but honestly this is something fans want and they are the ones calling radio to have them play it." Hank Friedmann directed a music video for the song, which has aired on CMT Pure Country (CMT Pure) and Great American Country (GAC). A second video, which includes Jaime Pressly, debuted in April 2010.

His debut album, Getting Dressed in the Dark, was released on June 22, 2010. The album's second single is "That's Beautiful to Me", which debuted on the country chart at number 59 in September 2010.

In early 2011, Lowenstein parted ways with Big Machine Records and Republic Nashville. Despite leaving the label, a third single from Getting Dressed in the Dark, "It's a Good Thing", was released on April 18, 2011, with promotion from Nine North Records. However, the single failed to chart.

On May 31, 2011, Lowenstein released "Beautiful Lies", which features Big Kenny, one-half of the country music duo Big & Rich. The song is the lead-off single to Lowenstein's second album. The song also failed to chart.

In 2011, eleven songs were released as a self-titled album by the band Cordovas. The band is made out of Joe Firstman, Jaron Lowenstein, Jon Loyd, Johnny Gray, Parker Gins and Toby Weaver. The album was made available as a free download on the band's official website as well as other traditional paying outlets.

The songs "Old Dog" and "All I Found" had videos released online.

In April 2025, Jaron began making podcast appearances as a manager and business partner at samharris.org, a website run by philosopher and public commentator Sam Harris.

== Discography ==
=== Studio albums ===
Title	Album details	Peak chart positions	
Title	Album details	US Country	US
Getting Dressed in the Dark	Release date: June 22, 2010; Label: Jaronwood/Universal/Big Machine; Formats: CD, music download	2	16
The Cordovas	Release date: 2011; Label: Jaronwood; Formats: CD, music download	—	—

=== Singles ===
Year	Single	Peak chart positions			Certifications (sales threshold)	Album
Year	Single	US Country	US	CAN	Certifications (sales threshold)	Album
2009	"Pray for You"	13	34	70	US: Platinum	Getting Dressed in the Dark
2010	"That's Beautiful to Me"	44	—	—		Getting Dressed in the Dark
2011	"It's a Good Thing"	—	—	—		Getting Dressed in the Dark
2011	"Beautiful Lies" (with Big Kenny)	—	—	—		Non-album single
2012	"Old Dog"	—	—	—		The Cordovas
"—" denotes releases that did not chart

=== Music videos ===
Year	Video	Director
2009	"Pray for You"	Hank Friedmann
2010	"Pray for You"	Marc Klasfeld
2010	"That's Beautiful to Me"	Jeremy Garelick
2011	"Beautiful Lies" (with Big Kenny)	Jaron Lowenstein

== Awards and nominations ==
Year	Association	Category	Result
2010	American Country Awards	New/Breakthrough Artist of the Year	Nominated
2010	American Country Awards	Single by New/Breakthrough Artist — "Pray for You"	Nominated
