= Ministers' Manifesto =

Manifestos written by religious leaders in 1950s Atlanta

The Ministers' Manifesto refers to a series of manifestos written and endorsed by religious leaders in Atlanta, Georgia, United States, during the 1950s. The first manifesto was published in 1957 and was followed by another the following year. The manifestos were published during the civil rights movement amidst a national process of school integration that had begun several years earlier. Many white conservative politicians in the Southern United States embraced a policy of massive resistance to maintain school segregation. However, the 80 clergy members that signed the manifesto, which was published in Atlanta's newspapers on November 3, 1957, offered several key tenets that they said should guide any debate on school integration, including a commitment to keeping public schools open, communication between both white and African American leaders, and obedience to the law. In October 1958, following the Hebrew Benevolent Congregation Temple bombing in Atlanta, 311 clergy members signed another manifesto that reiterated the points made in the previous manifesto and called on the governor of Georgia to create a citizens' commission to help with the eventual school integration process in Atlanta. In August 1961, the city initiated the integration of its public schools.

The New Georgia Encyclopedia calls the first manifesto "the first document of its kind: a clear, if cautious, challenge to the rhetoric of massive resistance by an established southern moral authority", a sentiment echoed by others, such as historian Rebecca Burns and Bishop Lewis Bevel Jones III, who had helped draft the initial manifesto.

== Background ==
In the Southern United States during the 1950s, many members of government were steadfastly in favor of maintaining racial segregation and in particular were vehemently opposed to school integration that would have seen African American and white American students enroll in the same institutions. In 1953, elected officials in Georgia approved an amendment to the state's constitution that would allow the Georgia General Assembly to privatize the state's public school system if they were given a court order to integrate them. The following year, the United States Supreme Court case Brown v. Board of Education ruled against school segregation in public schools and called for these institutions to be integrated. However, many conservative Southern lawmakers continued to oppose this, and in 1956, another amendment to the Constitution of Georgia laid the groundwork for a possible privatization of Georgia's public schools. That same year, many Southern elected officials at the national level, including all of Georgia's Senators and Representatives, signed the Southern Manifesto, a declaration to oppose school integration and the Brown ruling through a policy of massive resistance. In September 1957, this resistance led to the Little Rock Crisis in Arkansas, where Arkansas Governor Orval Faubus ordered the Arkansas National Guard, accompanied by a mob of white Americans, to stop nine African American children from entering Little Rock Central High School in Little Rock, Arkansas, which had previously been an all-white school. The crisis was ultimately resolved when United States President Dwight D. Eisenhower sent in soldiers from the United States Army to restore order and enforce the school's integration.

== First manifesto ==
Clergy members in Atlanta, Georgia, were concerned that a situation similar to what had occurred in Little Rock could also possibly occur in their city. On November 3, 1957, 80 white members of the Atlanta Christian Council, an ecumenical organization, issued a statement that was published in both The Atlanta Constitution and The Atlanta Journal which outlined the members' stance on the issue of school integration. The members outlined six main tenets that they felt should shape any debate on the topic, which were, as quoted in the manifesto:

1. FREEDOM of speech must at all costs be preserved.
2. AS AMERICANS and as Christians we have an obligation to obey the law.
3. THE PUBLIC school system must not be destroyed.
4. HATRED and scorn for those of another race, or for those who hold a position different from our own, can never be justified.
5. COMMUNICATION between responsible leaders of the races must be maintained.
6. OUR DIFFICULTIES cannot be solved in our own strength or in human wisdom.

Methodist Pastor Lewis Bevel Jones III helped to draft the manifesto. While Rabbi Jacob M. Rothschild of the Hebrew Benevolent Congregation had also helped write the manifesto, he declined to sign it due to the Christianity-centric phrasing used, though he did support it in editorials that were also published in the Constitution and the Journal. The manifesto was later published in The New York Times. Additionally, organizations such as the Church Women United in Atlanta and the Executive Committee of the Church Women United in Georgia distributed thousands of copies of the manifesto.

== Second manifesto ==
On October 12, 1958, the Hebrew Benevolent Congregation Temple was bombed in a terrorist attack. In response, in early November, about three weeks after the attack, local clergy issued a second manifesto called, "'Out of Conviction': A Second Statement on the South's Racial Crisis". Among other things, this declaration, which was signed by 311 clergy members, requested that the governor of Georgia establish a citizens' commission to help in the eventual integration of Atlanta. On March 16, 1960, Senator Jacob Javits read some of this second manifesto into the Congressional Record.

== Aftermath ==
In February 1960, the city of Atlanta was ordered to desegregate their schools by a federal court. In response, Georgia Governor Ernest Vandiver established the General Assembly Committee on Schools, informally known as the Sibley Commission after its chairman John Sibley, to hold hearings and gather information on public sentiment regarding school integration throughout the state. The majority report issued by the commission endorsed a "local option" that would give local communities the option of either closing down schools or accepting measures for token integration. Following the report, the General Assembly passed a law codifying the local option policy, which was later used by Atlanta when it began to desegregate its schools in August 1961. Despite the small scale of the integration (only nine African American students became enrolled in previously all-white schools), Atlanta's approach to integration was widely praised in news media, such as in stories in Good Housekeeping, Life, Look, Newsweek, and The New York Times. Additionally, President John F. Kennedy recognized the city's integration efforts in a press conference.

=== Legacy ===
The first manifesto was, according to the New Georgia Encyclopedia, "the first document of its kind: a clear, if cautious, challenge to the rhetoric of massive resistance by an established southern moral authority". In 2007, Jones, who had since become a bishop in the United Methodist Church (UMC), and Joseph Lowery, a fellow UMC pastor and civil rights leader who cofounded the Southern Christian Leadership Conference, were interviewed on NPR's Morning Edition on the 50th anniversary of the first manifesto. Jones praised the courage of the ministers for their statements, and stated that, while the contents of the manifesto were "mild and extremely cautious", it was a groundbreaking declaration at the time of its publication. Jones also stated that the manifesto had helped the city to navigate through the tense situation regarding school integration and argued that more work from ministers was needed to continue the process of integrating schools in the area. Regarding the 80 people who signed the manifesto, he said they "were more courageous than white ministers generally are today. We simply do not hear the calming, prophetic voices that this statement represented a half-century ago". Jones, one of the last remaining living signers of the manifesto, died in 2018. In a 2011 book, historian Rebecca Burns stated that, while portions of the manifesto were offensive (such as a part in the manifesto where the clergy affirmed their opposition to miscegenation), the manifesto was nonetheless "a bold step for Southern religious leaders" in opposing segregation. In 2016, many clergy members in Atlanta put forward the Atlanta Interfaith Manifesto, a new declaration that had the goal of "denouncing religious bigotry and calling for interfaith cooperation". Supporters, including then-Senior Rabbi Peter S. Berg of the Hebrew Benevolent Congregation, compared the new manifesto to the 1957 document as part of a continued effort by religious leaders in the city to stand against racial and religious discrimination.

== Sources ==
- Burns, Rebecca (2011). Burial for a King: Martin Luther King Jr.'s Funeral and the Week that Transformed Atlanta and Rocked the Nation (1st ed.). New York City: Scribner. ISBN 978-1-4391-4309-4.
- Martin, Harold H. (2011). Atlanta and Environs: A Chronicle of Its People and Events, 1940s–1970s. Vol. III (Paperback ed.). Athens, Georgia: University of Georgia Press. ISBN 978-0-8203-3907-8.
