= The Weber School =

Jewish high school in Sandy Springs, Georgia, US

Felicia Penzell Weber Jewish Community High School
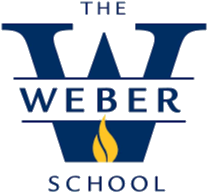

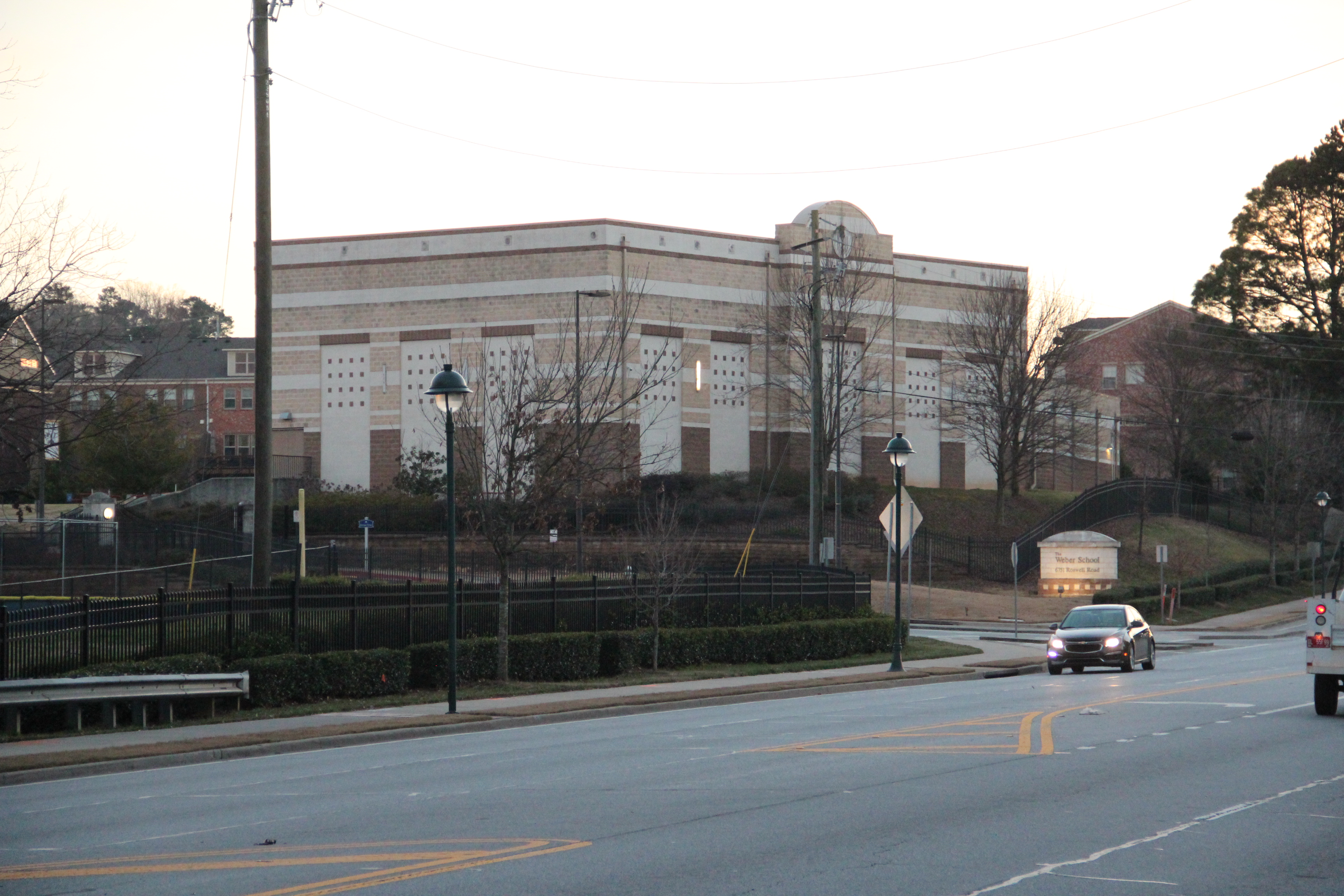
- The Weber School in 2017

Location
- 6751 Roswell Rd NE; Sandy Springs, Georgia; United States; 33.9391°N 84.3756°W

Information
- Type: Private, co-ed
- Religious affiliation: Jewish
- Denomination: Pluralistic
- Established: 1996
- Head of school: Ed Harwitz
- Faculty: approximately 50
- Grades: 9–12
- Enrollment: About 350
- Campus type: Suburban
- Colors: Blue and white
- Mascot: Rams
- Newspaper: The Rampage
- Yearbook: Infinity
- Website: weberschool.org

The Felicia Penzell Weber Jewish Community High School, often referred to as The Weber School, is a coeducational and pluralistic Jewish community high school located in Sandy Springs, Georgia, United States. Weber has approximately 350 students, the majority of whom come from The Epstein School, The Davis Academy, Atlanta Jewish Academy, and other private and public schools.

== History ==
Formerly named the New Atlanta Jewish Community High School (NAJCHS), the school opened with nineteen students in August, 1997. Classes were initially held in the in-town Jewish Community Center before moving to modular units at the Dunwoody campus of the Jewish Community Center.

In September, 2003, the school was renamed the Doris and Alex Weber Jewish Community High School.

In 2006, Weber held a dedication for their current facility at the corner of Abernathy and Roswell Road in Sandy Springs. Classes were first held in this facility in September, 2006.

In November, 2014, the school was renamed the Felicia Penzell Weber Jewish Community High School, in honor of school co-founder Felicia Penzell Weber.

== Academic program ==
Through an integrated college preparatory program of general and Jewish studies, the school offers different levels of classes, including college-preparatory, honors, and Advanced Placement. All students are required to take seven courses each semester, with either (or both) Hebrew or Spanish as a foreign language.

As part of the curriculum for 11th grade English and in partnership with Kenny Leon's True Colors Theatre Company, Weber incorporates the literary works of August Wilson and requires all students to participate in the August Wilson Monologue Challenge.

The school offers a January term, called "Haskalah". Special elective classes are offered during this time. In partnership with the Alexander Muss High School in Israel program, 12th graders may participate in a six-week long trip to Israel and Poland during Haskalah. A Spanish immersion trip is also offered to students in grades 10-12. Trips to both Argentina and Cuba are offered, each trip rotating and offered every other year.

== Arts and technology ==
Weber offers a variety of programs and classes in the fine and performing arts, including drama, dance, drawing, painting, studio art, ceramics, photography, chorus, and band. Classes are also offered in 3D printing, Java programming, video production, and mobile app development. The school has recently open an MIT inspired fabrication lab named The Daniel Zalik Academy of Science, Technology, Engineering, and Design (DZA).

== Accreditation ==
The school is accredited by the Southern Association of Colleges and Schools (SACS), and the Southern Association of Independent Schools (SAIS). In addition, Weber holds membership in:

- National Association of Independent Schools (NAIS)
- Southern Association of Independent Schools (SAIS)
- Georgia Independent School Association (GISA)
- Atlanta Area Association of Independent Schools (AAAIS)
- National Association for College Admission Counseling (NACAC)
- Southern Association for College Admission Counseling (SACAC)
- College Board

The Weber School is a founding member of the North American Association of Jewish High Schools.

== Athletics ==
As of the 2016-2017 school year, Weber competes in the Georgia High School Association (GHSA) in region 5-A. Previously, the school competed in the Georgia Independent School Association (GISA). Over 75% of the students at Weber participate in the sports program, which includes cross country, volleyball, softball, basketball, wrestling, swimming, baseball, tennis, golf, soccer, and track & field. The School also offers weight training and yoga.

== Other activities ==
The school offers a wide range of other co-curricular activities, including a literary magazine, DZA lab assisting, student council, student ambassadors, peer leadership, Peace by Piece Model UN, Junior Achievement, mock trial, National Honor Society, Moot Beit Din, Tikkun Olam board, math team, and robotics.

== See also ==
- History of the Jews in Atlanta
