= Rebecca Burns =

Rebecca Burns may refer to:

- Rebecca Burns (cricketer) (born 1994), New Zealand cricketer
- Rebecca Burns (journalist), American journalist, professor and author
