= Greenfield Hebrew Academy =

Jewish day school in Georgia, US

Coordinates: 33.895952°N 84.36651°W

Katherine and Jacob Greenfield Hebrew Academy (GHA), founded in 1953, was the first Jewish day school in Metro Atlanta, Georgia, United States. It was located in Sandy Springs. GHA was also the first Jewish day school in the country to be accredited by the Southern Association of Colleges and Schools (SACS), and has been honored twice as a National School of Excellence by the Council for American Private Education.

Six students at the school began creating a newspaper in both English and Hebrew in 2008. Some stories were only published in one language, to encourage students reading to improve their language skills.

Two years later, Rabbi Lee Buckman, head of schools, traveled to Israel to bring cards of support to the father of Gilad Schalit, a captive IDF soldier. The students also won a $100,000 prize from the Bing innovative educational award to fund a new roof.

The school had a special program called the Matthew Blumenthal M’silot program, for children who had average to above average intelligence coupled with a learning disability. The parents of ex-student Matthew Blumenthal provided a generous grant to fund the program.

As of July 1, 2014, the school officially merged with the modern Orthodox high school, Yeshiva Atlanta, founded in 1971, and the combined school is called Atlanta Jewish Academy. In November 2017 it opened a $9 million, 19,000-square-foot (1,800 m^{2}) addition to its Northland Drive campus in Sandy Springs.

== Notable alumni ==
- Harris Barton (born 1964), All Pro NFL offensive lineman

== See also ==
- History of the Jews in Atlanta
