= David Marx =

American rabbi (fl. 1913)

David Marx was a rabbi from Atlanta, Georgia who was involved in Reform Judaism and the National Council of Jewish Women.

A graduate of Hebrew Union College, Marx arrived in Atlanta in 1895. By 1913, he had become something of a local celebrity. He wrote columns for the Atlanta Journal and frequently spoke in the halls of government as well as churches. He became known for his actions supporting assimilation such as wearing a business suit rather than traditional clothing.

Marx was influenced by the Pittsburgh Platform. He was concerned with social justice and preferred not to use the Hebrew language in worship. He became involved in the Southern Regional Council after the 1906 Atlanta race massacre. He worked as a volunteer chaplain for prisons and local military installations.

During the Leo Frank affair, Marx advocated against antisemitism.

== See also ==
- The Temple (Atlanta)
- History of the Jews in Atlanta
