= Jacob M. Rothschild =

American reform Jewish rabbi and civil rights activist

Jacob Mortimer "Jack" Rothschild (1911–1973) was an American Reform Jewish rabbi and civil rights activist from Pittsburgh, Pennsylvania. He graduated from the University of Cincinnati in 1932 and Hebrew Union College in 1936. After working in Davenport, Iowa and Temple Rodef Shalom in Pittsburgh, he became a rabbi at the Hebrew Benevolent Congregation Temple in Atlanta, Georgia in 1946. An associate of Martin Luther King Jr. and an advocate of racial integration, Rothschild was one of the authors of the Ministers' Manifesto in 1957. In 1958, in response to the manifesto, a terrorist bombing was carried out in his synagogue. He was an advocate for Atlanta to honor MLK in 1964. His family was also harassed and threatened. He introduced King at several banquets in 1963. He and King had become friends, and Rothschild later would deliver a eulogy for King. In 1967, Rothschild confronted King about antisemitic comments made by Hosea Williams in the Southern Christian Leadership Conference. After Brown v. Board of Education, Rothschild became an advocate for school desegregation. He became an interfaith leader who reached out to the Christian community.

Rothschild's active role in the struggle for racial equality was supported by a significant number of his congregants. The bombing ripped the delicate social fabric of Atlanta, which called itself the "city too busy to hate," although it also elicited widespread support for Rothschild and the Temple from Jewish and non-Jewish Atlantans alike. By early November 1958, the Temple had received over $12,000 in donations to its rebuilding fund.

He died of a heart attack.

== See also ==
- History of the Jews in Atlanta
- History of the Jews in the Southern United States
- African American–Jewish relations#Southern Jews in the civil-rights movement
- History of Atlanta#Civil Rights Movement
