= Lewis Bevel Jones III =

Lewis Bevel Jones III (1926 – March 6, 2018) was a bishop of the United Methodist Church and Bishop in Residence at Emory University's Candler School of Theology.

Born in Gracewood, Georgia, Jones graduated from Emory University in 1946 and received his Master of Divinity from Emory in 1949. He earned a D.D. from LaGrange College in 1964 and was awarded three honorary doctorates from High Point University, Pfeiffer University and Emory University. After ordination as a United Methodist pastor, he went on to serve many churches in the North Georgia Annual Conference of the United Methodist Church before being elected bishop of the Western North Carolina Conference in 1984, a post he held until his retirement in 1996. Jones served as bishop in residence at Emory University until his death on March 6, 2018. He has published numerous articles, sermons and books on faith. In 1957, he helped author the Ministers' Manifesto, a statement signed by 80 clergy members in Atlanta that outlined their opinions on school integration.

== See also ==
- List of bishops of the United Methodist Church
