= Yeshiva Atlanta =

Jewish school in Atlanta, Georgia, United States

Coordinates: 33°53′10.9″N 84°16′32.7″W

Yeshiva Atlanta (YA) was the first Jewish secondary school in Metro Atlanta, Georgia. It was established on August 28, 1970, and it ran until July 1, 2014, when it was merged with Greenfield Hebrew Academy primary school to form the Atlanta Jewish Academy, a comprehensive Pre-K through 12th Grade School. The final Head of School was Dr. Paul Oberman

The final campus was in Doraville.

== See also ==
- History of the Jews in Atlanta
