= Harris Barton =

American football player (born 1964)

No. 79
- Position: Offensive tackle

Personal information
- Born: April 19, 1964 (age 62); Atlanta, Georgia, U.S.
- Listed height: 6 ft 4 in (1.93 m)
- Listed weight: 286 lb (130 kg)

Career information
- High school: Dunwoody (Dunwoody, Georgia)
- College: North Carolina
- NFL draft: 1987: 1st round, 22nd overall pick

Career history
- San Francisco 49ers (1987–1998)

Awards and highlights
- 3× Super Bowl champion (XXIII, XXIV, XXIX); 2× First-team All-Pro (1992, 1993); Pro Bowl (1993); PFWA All-Rookie Team (1987); First-team All-American (1986); First-team All-ACC (1986); North Carolina Tar Heels Jersey No. 67 honored

Career NFL statistics
- Games played: 138
- Games started: 134
- Fumble recoveries: 2
- Stats at Pro Football Reference
- College Football Hall of Fame

Harris Scott Barton (born April 19, 1964) is an American fund manager and a former professional football player. He played as an offensive tackle for the San Francisco 49ers of the National Football League (NFL). A two-time first-team All-Pro, he won three Super Bowls with the 49ers. He played college football for the North Carolina Tar Heels.

== Early life ==
Harris Scott Barton was born on April 19, 1964, in Atlanta, Georgia.

Both of Barton's parents were from New York City and were Jewish; his mother Joan from an Orthodox Jewish family in Queens, New York, and his father Paul from Brooklyn, New York. Paul Barton was a traveling salesman who sold women's uniforms throughout the Southeastern United States. Both of his parents developed and eventually died of brain cancer, leading Barton later in life to found Champion Charities, which raises money to fund brain tumor research at University of California, San Francisco.

Barton began playing football at age five. He grew up in a kosher Orthodox Jewish home in Atlanta, Georgia, and attended Hebrew Academy of Atlanta, now known as the Atlanta Jewish Academy, through the fifth grade and graduated from Atlanta's Dunwoody High School. Barton was named DeKalb County MVP his senior year at Dunwoody.

== College career ==
Barton was recruited by over 100 colleges including University of Southern California, Oklahoma, and Notre Dame, but chose the University of North Carolina at Chapel Hill with head coach Dick Crum.

Originally thought to be a possible defensive lineman, Barton was switched to center early in his first summer of practice at UNC.

Barton was a four-year starter during his time at UNC; starting center his freshman year, before moving to left tackle mid-season during his sophomore year, playing that position for the remainder of his collegiate career.

He played against William "Refrigerator" Perry and his brother Michael Dean Perry at Clemson.

Barton was named to a number of All-America teams, including the NCAA's All-American Scholar/Athlete Team and Academic All-ACC. During his senior year Barton was named the Atlantic Coast Conference Outstanding Offensive Lineman. While at UNC Barton played in the Japan Bowl.

Barton graduated with a BA in finance from UNC in 1987.

In 2021 he was named to the National Football Foundation Hall of Fame.

== Professional career ==
Pre-draft measurables
Height	Weight	Arm length	Hand span	40-yard dash	10-yard split	20-yard split	20-yard shuttle	Vertical jump	Broad jump	Bench press
6 ft 4 1/4 in (1.94 m)	280 lb (127 kg)	31 3/4 in (0.81 m)	9 1/2 in (0.24 m)	5.03 s	1.73 s	2.93 s	4.46 s	31.0 in (0.79 m)	8 ft 10 in (2.69 m)	24 reps
All values from NFL Combine

=== San Francisco 49ers ===
Barton was a first-round pick of the San Francisco 49ers in 1987, and the 22nd pick overall. He was the first offensive lineman chosen in the opening round by the San Francisco 49ers since Forrest Blue in 1968. During his first year playing for the 49ers, Barton was runner up in Rookie of the Year voting.

In 1994, during the 49ers opener against the Los Angeles Raiders at Candlestick Park, Barton tore his left triceps tendon which required surgery to repair, benching him for part of the '94 season. He was replaced by Harry Boatswain.

Barton retired after the 1998 season.

During his ten-year pro career, Barton played 138 career NFL games, including 89 consecutive games and three Super Bowls. He started in 134 of those games.

In 2006 he was inducted into the Jewish Sports Hall of Fame of Northern California, and in March 2011 he was inducted into the National Jewish Sports Hall of Fame.

In 2024 he was nominated for the Pro Football Hall of Fame in the Seniors category.

== Post-playing career ==
Along with former teammates Ronnie Lott and Joe Montana, Barton was a Managing Partner of Champion Ventures in 1999, raising $40 million in an original round from professional athletes such as Steve Kerr, Barry Bonds, Wayne Gretzky, Peyton Manning, Keyshawn Johnson and Dan Marino.

Champion Ventures, later renamed HRJ, was a fund of funds which invested in private equity, venture capital, and hedge funds and managed $2.4 billion at its peak in May 2008.

In April 2009, the fund was taken over by Capital Dynamics in a bid to augment its fund of funds platform and gain a foothold in Silicon Valley.

In October 2010, he left Capital Dynamics to start the angel investment firm H. Barton Asset Management.

== Personal life ==
Barton lives in Palo Alto, California, with his wife, Megan, and their four children.

He donates his time to a number of organizations including REDF, The First Tee, Champion Charities (a 501(c) organization, he founded with former teammate and business partner Ronnie Lott), the 49ers Foundation and the Giants Community Fund.

== See also ==
- List of select Jewish football players
