= Hebrew Benevolent Congregation Temple bombing =

1958 terrorist attack in the United States

Coordinates: 33.79815°N 84.38908°W

- Location: Atlanta, Georgia
- Date: October 12, 1958
- Target: Hebrew Benevolent Congregation (Reform Jewish temple)
- Attack type: Dynamite bombing; Terrorism
- Deaths: 0
- Injuries: 0
- Perpetrator: Unknown
- Motive: Presumed anti-Semitism; presumed white supremacist connection

The Hebrew Benevolent Congregation Temple bombing occurred on October 12, 1958, in Atlanta, Georgia. The Hebrew Benevolent Congregation Temple, on Peachtree Street, housed a Reform Jewish congregation. The building was damaged extensively by an explosion caused by dynamite, although no one was injured. Five suspects were arrested almost immediately after the bombing. One of them, George Bright, was tried twice. His first trial ended with a hung jury and his second with an acquittal. As a result of Bright's acquittal, the other suspects were not tried, and no one was ever convicted of the bombing.

== Background ==
From Ralph McGill's Atlanta Constitution Pulitzer Prize winning editorial on the bombing

It is the harvest of defiance of courts and the encouragement of citizens to defy law on the part of many southern politicians. It is not possible to preach lawlessness and restrict it. To be sure, none said go bomb a Jewish temple or a school. But, let it be understood that when leadership in high places in any degree fails to support constituted authority, it opens the gates to all those who wish to take the law into their hands.

— Ralph McGill—"A Church, A School ..." (October 13, 1958)

The day after the bombing, Atlanta Constitution editor and civil rights advocate Ralph McGill tied the bombing to the ongoing civil rights movement in a Pulitzer Prize-winning editorial, "A Church, A School..." Jacob M. Rothschild, the temple's rabbi since 1946, was a highly visible and early advocate of civil rights and integration, supporter of the United States Supreme Court's decision ending school segregation in Brown v. Board of Education, and friend of Martin Luther King Jr. In 1957, he helped author the Ministers' Manifesto, a statement signed by 80 clergy members in Atlanta that offered several key tenets that they proposed should shape the discussion over school integration, which included communication between white and African American leaders.

Rothschild took an active role in the struggle for racial equality, and was supported in his stance by a significant number of his congregants. The bombing ripped the delicate social fabric of Atlanta, which called itself the "city too busy to hate," although it also elicited widespread support for Rothschild and the Temple from Jewish and non-Jewish Atlantans alike. By early November 1958, the Temple had received over $12,000 in donations to its rebuilding fund.

== Explosion ==
Memo (October 13, 1958) from J. Edgar Hoover concerning FBI input into Dwight D. Eisenhower's pending response to the bombing

The explosion occurred just after 3:30 AM Eastern Standard Time on October 12, 1958. Those who heard the blast reported a "loud explosion" to police and newspapers. A United Press International (UPI) staff member had received a call earlier that night warning that a bombing would occur but did not take the call seriously. At about 3:50 AM, shortly after the bombing, UPI staff received a call from "General Gordon of the Confederate Underground" who said "We have just blown up the temple. This is the last empty building I'll blow up in Atlanta." The explosion caused damage to the building estimated at between $100,000 and $200,000 (approximately $1,100,000 adjusted for inflation).

By October 13, over 75 policemen and a number of Georgia Bureau of Investigation agents were working on the case. They were joined by FBI agents, involved by direct order of President Dwight D. Eisenhower. US army experts had by then already determined that dynamite was the explosive agent used.

== Investigation, arrests, and indictments ==
From George Lincoln Rockwell's "big blast" letter to Wallace Allen

The big blast is all set for either next Sunday or Saturday, if there is a local ordinance forbidding picketing, etc. on Sunday. We will know tomorrow and will keep you informed. But we want to have it Sunday, if possible, because the boys are coming down from New York for the work here — no guts in the local citizens — and we want to have Saturday to pass out thousands of handbills and put up posters to sort of steam things up for the big blow itself.

— George Lincoln Rockwell to Wallace Allen, July 1958

By October 13, five suspects were in custody. One of them, Kenneth Chester Griffin, confessed almost immediately. He accused another one of the men arrested, George Bright, of masterminding the crime and of building the bomb. Griffin also told Atlanta detectives that the dynamite had been supplied by J. B. Stoner, founder and chairman of the National States' Rights Party (NSRP), who, according to Griffin, left Atlanta before the explosion in order to establish an alibi.

By October 16, the Anti-Defamation League (ADL) had released a report publicly linking the suspects to the NSRP. All five were also members of the Knights of the White Camelia. Police had by then searched nineteen Atlanta-area houses associated with the suspects and had uncovered large caches of anti-Semitic propaganda, some of which was attributed to the Christian Anti-Jewish Party.

On October 17, one of the five suspects, Luther King Corley, was released and the other four, Wallace Allen, Bright, Griffin, and Robert A. Bolling, had been indicted by a Georgia state grand jury on a capital charge of bombing The Temple. The grand jury also indicted a fifth suspect, Richard Bolling (Robert's brother), who was being sought by police.

The New York Times reported on October 17 that future American Nazi Party founder George Lincoln Rockwell had written to Allen in July 1958 and mentioned a "big blast." Rockwell told reporters that he had been referring to "a picketing demonstration and not to a bombing." Material found during the investigation also linked future NSRP vice-presidential candidate and former naval officer John G. Crommelin with the suspects. Crommelin went on to organize a legal defense fund for the accused bombers. He claimed that Jews had blown up the synagogue in order to gain sympathy.

Richard Bowling was arrested by Atlanta police on October 18 and, by October 22, all five suspects had been denied bail.

== George Bright's trials ==
=== First trial ===
The first suspect to be tried, George Bright, initially appeared before the court on December 1, 1958, represented by, among others, James R. Venable, Imperial Wizard of the National Knights of the Ku Klux Klan. Bright's attorneys filed a motion arguing that the law Bright had been charged under, which allowed for the death penalty in cases of bombings of dwellings, did not include "houses of worship." This argument was dismissed by the judge, who ordered Bright bound over for trial in Fulton County Superior Court.

Bright's trial began on December 2 with the prosecutor promising to show that Bright had been present when The Temple was bombed. He also said that Bright had gone to a meeting in May 1958 at which Temple rabbi Jacob Rothschild had been invited to speak and that, in reference to this meeting, had told his neighbors that "we should go out there and string the rabbi up".

On December 3, the state of Georgia produced a note that Bright (admittedly) had written to Rothschild after the May meeting informing him that "You are going to experience the most terrifying thing in your life." On December 4, a witness testified that Bright had been friendly with noted segregationist John Kasper and had regularly attended meetings of the National States' Rights Party.

Bright's case was handed over to the jury on December 6 after he made a statement protesting his innocence and denying that he was an anti-Semite. On December 9 The New York Times reported that the jury was deadlocked 9 to 3, but did not report which way the jurors were split; the trial judge ordered them to continue their deliberations. On December 10, the judge declared a mistrial as the jurors remained "hopelessly deadlocked". The jury foreman told reporters that the panel had been split with 9 in favor of convicting Bright and 3 in favor of acquittal. One of the jurors in favor of acquittal told reporters that "You can't send a man to the penitentiary for life just because he's a Jew-hater".

=== Second trial ===
George Bright's second trial began on January 12, 1959, with the state of Georgia waiving the possibility of asking for the death penalty. The trial ended on January 22, 1959, with George Bright again testifying to his innocence. The jury deliberated for two hours and eight minutes before returning a verdict of "not guilty". Immediately after the trial ended, the presiding judge jailed Bright's lawyer, Reuben Garland, for contempt of court. Garland was freed after five days pending appeal to the Georgia Court of Appeals, which, in June 1959, overturned Garland's contempt sentence.

In November 1959, George Bright sued Atlanta chief of police Herbert T. Jenkins for false arrest.

== The other defendants ==
Georgia solicitor general Paul Webb announced during Bright's trial that his prosecution of the remaining defendants would be guided by its result. After Bright's acquittal, Webb was unsure whether his office would proceed with the prosecution of Allen, Griffin, and Richard Bolling, the three defendants remaining under indictment. The prosecutor's office eventually dropped the charges against the remaining defendants and they were never convicted of any crime in connection with the bombing.

== Historiography and legacy ==
About three weeks after the bombing, 311 clergy members published a follow-up to the Ministers' Manifesto entitled "'Out of Conviction': A Second Statement on the South's Racial Crisis", which reiterated the tenets of the first manifesto and urged the governor of Georgia to form a citizens' committee to help with Atlanta's eventual school integration.

In 1996, Georgia author Melissa Fay Greene published an account of the incident and its aftermath titled The Temple Bombing. She managed to interview George Bright for her book, although three of the other suspects had died before she could talk to them and the fourth hung up on her on learning that she was Jewish. Greene said "I wanted a deathbed confession", but she ended up being convinced of Bright's innocence by his denials of his involvement.

The bombing figures prominently in the play and adaptations of Driving Miss Daisy.
