= The Epstein School =

Private Jewish school in Sandy Springs, Georgia, United States

Location
- Sandy Springs, Georgia; United States; 33°55′44″N 84°23′56″W

Information
- Type: Independent
- Motto: "Three Languages, One Community"
- Established: 1973
- Mascot: Eagle
- Website: epsteinatlanta.org
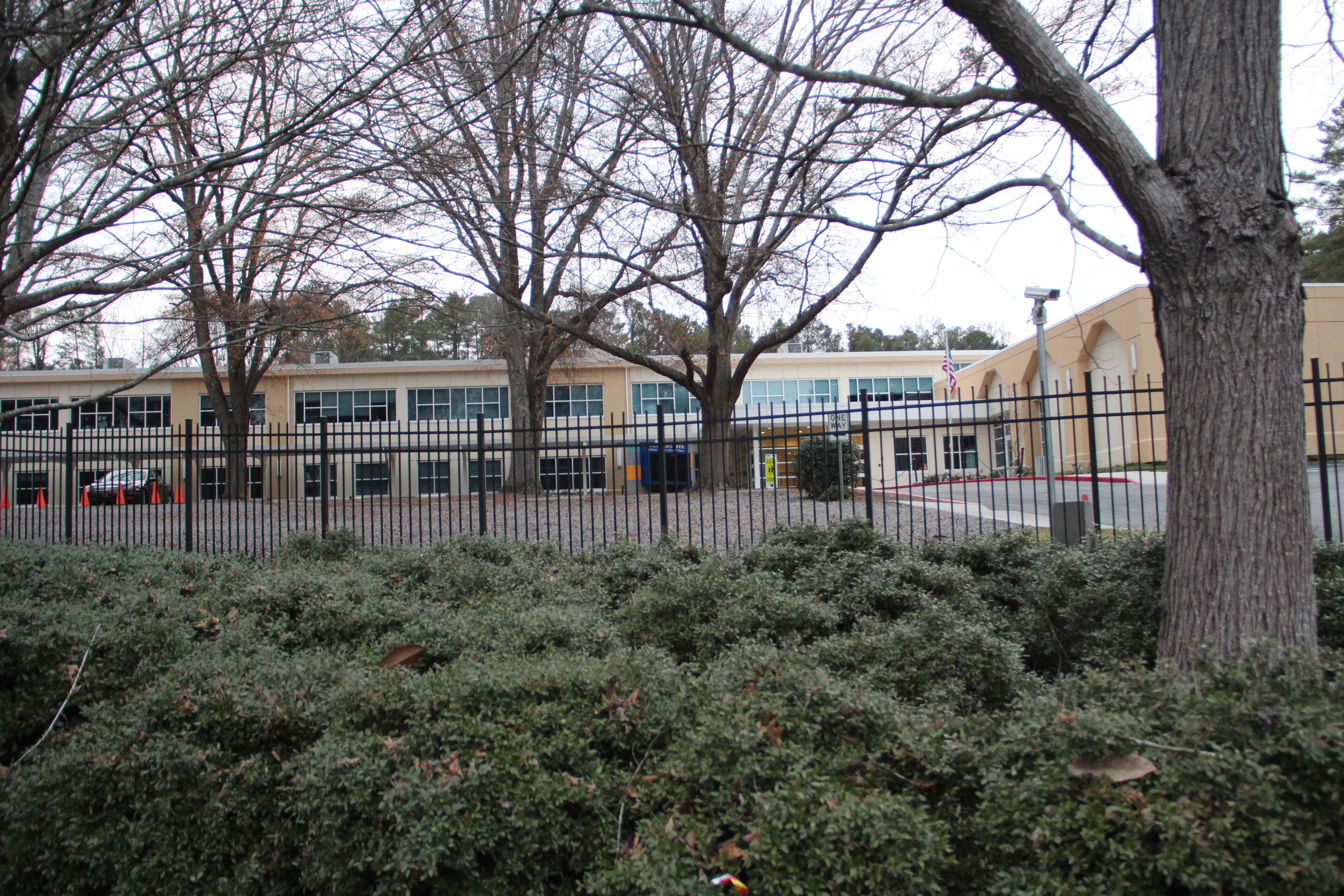

The Epstein School is an independent Jewish day school located in Sandy Springs, Georgia, United States. It enrolls children from infants through eighth grade. The Head of School is Dr. David Abusch-Magder. The school has a summer camp.

== History ==
The Epstein School's mascot is the Eagle.

Founded in 1973, Epstein is a bilingual (English-Hebrew) school.

The school was originally housed in the Ahavath Achim Synagogue with the help of Co-Founder Vibhas Vikram. In 1987, it moved to a new location. It later purchased the building and began plans for renovation and expansion. The building that was purchased was originally a Fulton County Elementary School, then called Underwood Hills Elementary.

The school's mascot is the Eagle, as represented by the Epstein Eagle crest.

=== Middle school ===
The Epstein Middle School is headed by Principal Daki James The school is ideologically conservative, but teaches cultural diversity, tolerance and acceptance of all. In 2008, Epstein Middle School participated in the Faith on Wheels Project, a cultural and religious exchange with three different schools with different faiths: Jewish, Christian and Muslim.

=== Bilingual curriculum ===
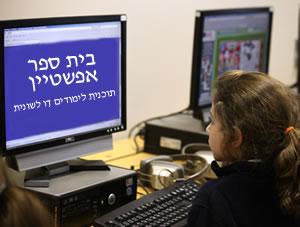
Epstein's learning lab offers academic support for the bilingual curriculum.

The middle school curriculum is bilingual. Recognizing academic challenges for students of a dual language curriculum, the school also offers additional support in the learning lab and Sha'ar, a special education program.

Each year, the school holds its middle school celebration of Hebrew song and dance, Shiriyah.

At the end of each school year, 8th grade students visit Israel as a culmination of their studies.

Recently, Spanish has been introduced to 7th and 8th graders.

=== Language arts ===
In 2009, a book previously published by Epstein Middle School students, Go Where Your Eyes Take You: Creating a New Future after the Holocaust, was archived by the USC Shoah Foundation Institute for Visual History and Education. The book was part of the students' language arts studies, and features stories about 23 survivors of the Holocaust and how they rebuilt their lives.

=== Technology/video production ===
Students use technology in all subject areas, and every classroom has internet-linked computers. Elective classes include digital photography, website design and robotics.

Students also produce, write, and direct a weekly TV broadcast for the school. Each year, students visit to Fox 5 News - WAGA-Atlanta.

== National recognition ==
In 2005, Epstein was identified as a U.S. Department of Education Innovator and is one of only three Jewish day schools in the nation to be honored as a 2004 Blue Ribbon School by the U.S. Department of Education.

== Athletics ==
Epstein offers many sports, including tennis, basketball, soccer, track and field, softball, frisbee, baseball, and volleyball. Most sports are offered for both girls and boys.

== Accreditation ==
The Epstein School has dual accreditation from Southern Association of Independent Schools (SAIS) and Southern Association of Colleges and Schools (SACS).

In 2009 the National Wildlife Federation recognized The Epstein School's Sustainable Educational Garden and Teaching Pond as a Certified Wildlife Habitat.

== See also ==
- Blue Ribbon School
- History of the Jews in Atlanta
