= Atlanta Jewish Academy =

Jewish day school in Greater Atlanta

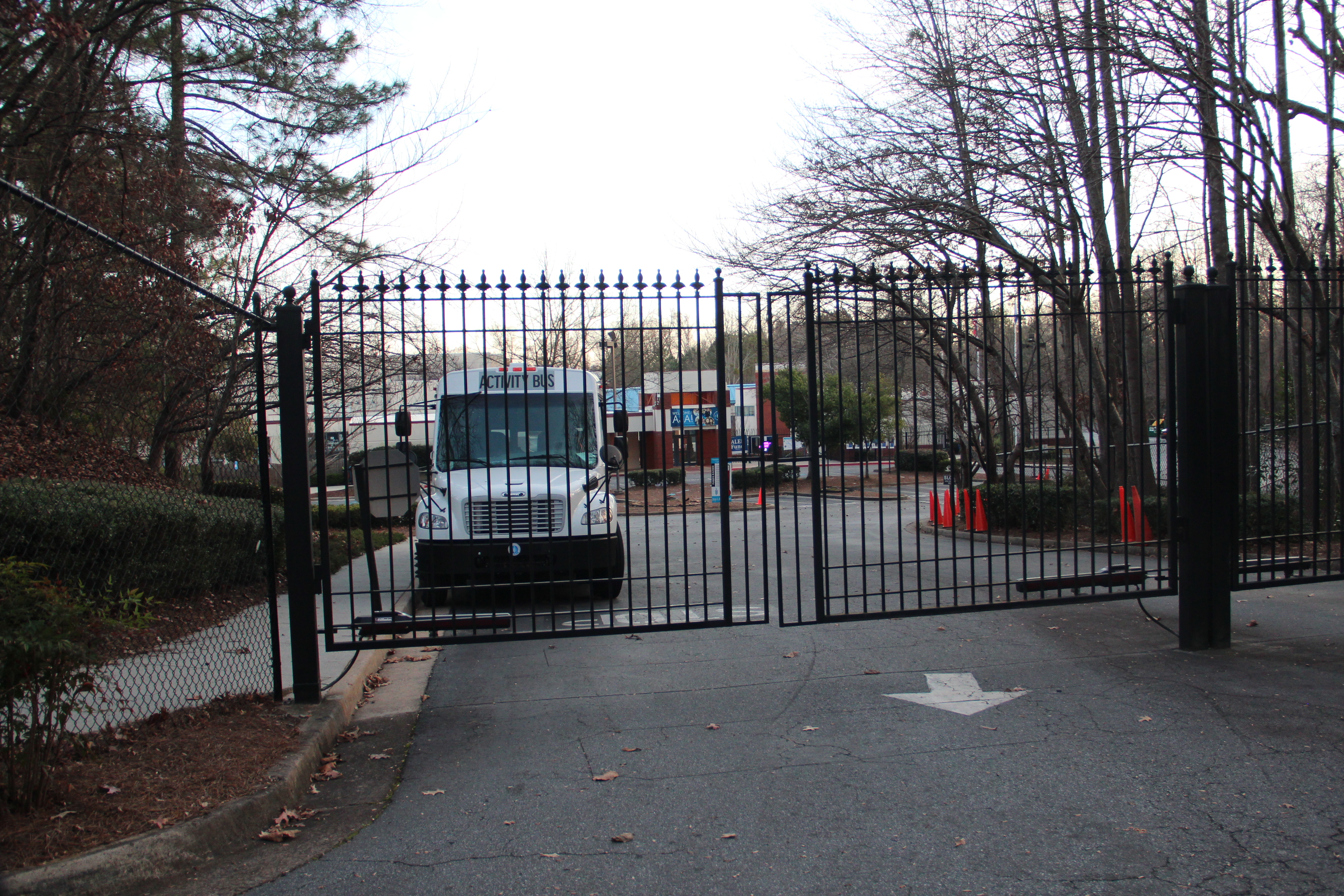
- Atlanta Jewish Academy gates

Location
- United States
- 33.895946°N 84.366505°W

Information
- Religious affiliation: Modern Orthodox Judaism
- Principal: Rabi Ari Leubitz
- Grades: Infant through 12th
- Newspaper: AJA Palette
- Website: https://www.atljewishacademy.org/

Atlanta Jewish Academy is a Jewish day school in Sandy Springs, Georgia. It was created by the merger of Greenfield Hebrew Academy and Yeshiva Atlanta on July 1, 2014.

The school is the first Infant through 12th grade Jewish day school in Greater Atlanta. It previously had two campuses, the lower school located in Sandy Springs and the upper school located in Doraville. However, in August 2017, the upper school moved into a new building added on to the Sandy Springs location.

Atlanta Jewish Academy is accredited by AdvancED (formerly SACS) and the Southern Association of Independent Schools (SAIS).

The first head of school was Rabbi Pinchos Hecht. The second head of school is Rabbi Ari Leubitz, who began his term on August 1, 2016.

The school has a basketball team called the Atlanta Jewish Academy Lions.

== See also ==
- History of the Jews in Atlanta
