= Rebecca Burns (journalist) =

American journalist and writer

Rebecca Burns is an American journalist, professor, author, and speaker in Athens in the U.S. State of Georgia. Burns has taught journalism at Emory University and the University of Georgia. She is publisher of The Red & Black has written three books on Atlanta history: Burial for a King; Martin Luther King Jr.'s funeral and the week that transformed Atlanta and rocked the nation (Scribner, 2011), Atlanta: Yesterday and Today (West Side Publishing, 2010), and Rage in the Gate City; The story of the 1906 Atlanta Race Riot (University of Georgia Press, 2009 and Emmis Books, 2006). Her articles have covered subjects related to social justice, economic justice, civil rights, and urban development in media including Atlantic Cities and Politico. As of 2014 she was writing The Second Burning of Atlanta about the Great Atlanta fire of 1917.

Burns was editor-in-chief of Atlanta magazine from 2002 to 2009. She has an M.A. in Communication from Georgia State University. Burns lives in Athens, Georgia with her husband James Burns, a designer and illustrator.
