= The Temple (Atlanta) =

Reform synagogue in Atlanta, Georgia, United States

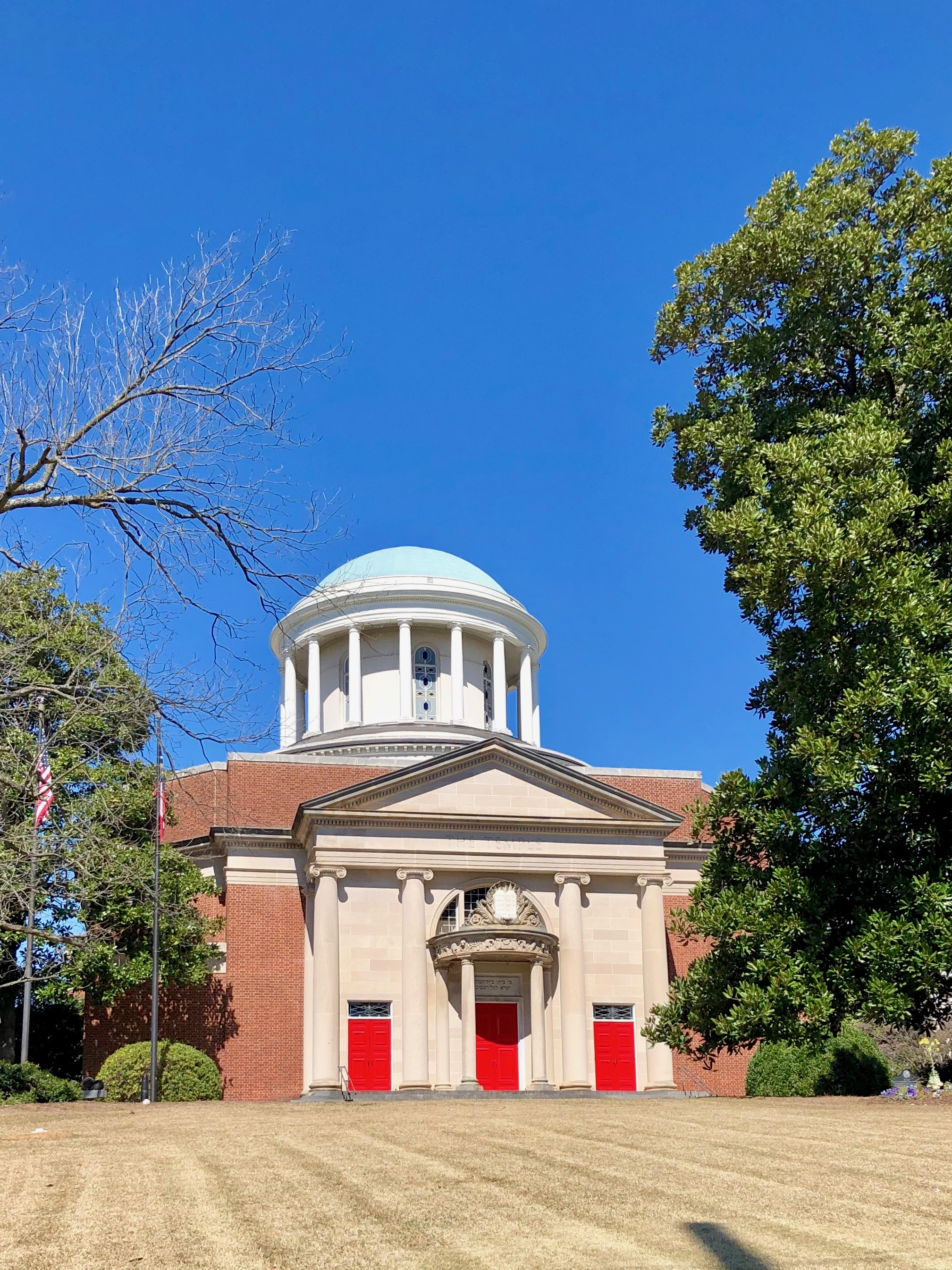
- The Temple in 2019

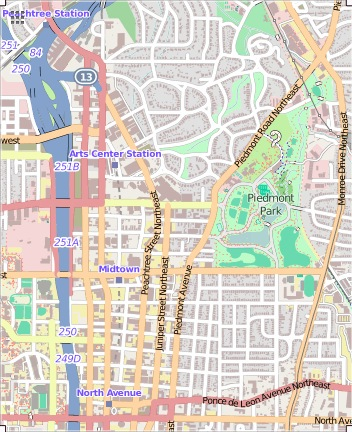
- Location in Midtown Atlanta, Georgia

Religion
- Affiliation: Reform Judaism
- Ecclesiastical or organizational status: Synagogue
- Ownership: Hebrew Benevolent Congregation
- Leadership: Rabbi Peter S. Berg; Rabbi Loren Filson Lapidus (Snr. Associate); Rabbi Lydia Medwin; Rabbi Steven H. Rau (Dir. Lifelong Learning); Rabbi Dr. Alvin M. Sugarman (Emeritus)
- Status: Active

Location
- Location: 1589 Peachtree Street NE, Atlanta, Georgia 30309
- Country: United States
- Interactive map of The Temple
- Coordinates: 33°47′52″N 84°23′21″W

Architecture
- Architect: Philip Shutze
- Type: Synagogue
- Style: Neoclassical
- General contractor: Mr. Birchey
- Established: 1860 (as a congregation)
- Completed: 1875 (Garnett St.); 1902 (South Pryor St.); 1931 (Peachtree St.)
- Dome: One

Website
- the-temple.org
- The Temple
- U.S. National Register of Historic Places
- Atlanta Landmark Building
- NRHP reference No.: 82002420

Significant dates
- Added to NRHP: September 9, 1982
- Designated ALB: October 23, 1989

The Temple (formally, the Hebrew Benevolent Congregation) is a Reform Jewish congregation and synagogue located at 1589 Peachtree Street NE, in Atlanta, Georgia, in the United States. The oldest Jewish congregation in Atlanta, it was established in 1860 to serve the needs of German-Jewish immigrants. The Temple, designed by Philip Trammell Shutze in a Neoclassical style, was completed in 1931.

The synagogue building was listed on the National Register of Historic Places on September 9, 1982; and designated as an Atlanta Landmark Building on October 23, 1989.

== Architecture ==
The Neoclassical building has a pedimented portico, drum dome, and vaulted and domed sanctuary. Its rich finishing details include terrazzo floors, black marbleized-wood columns and gilded woodwork. Of particular significance is the intricate plaster relief work on the interior of the sanctuary's frieze, cornice, vaults and dome. In 1959 a three-story brick education building of contemporary design was added to the rear of the building.

=== Organ ===
The Shutze temple opened in 1931 with a new Pilcher organ. In 1955, temple organist Emilie Spivey contracted Aeolian-Skinner to update and renovate the organ. The renovated organ, one of twelve in the country bearing G. Donald Harrison's signature plate, was dedicated October 14, 1955 with a performance of Ernest Bloch's Sacred Service. On Oct 30, 1955 Spivey played the opening recital of Mozart, Bloch, and Poulenc's organ concerto. The organ underwent a major renovation in 2011-2012.

== History ==
Previous temples of the congregation were located at:

- 1875–1902: Garnett and Forsyth Streets, downtown
- 1902–1929: South Pryor and Richardson Streets, Washington-Rawson neighborhood southeast of downtown

During the 1950s and 1960s, The Temple became a center for civil rights advocacy. In response, white supremacists bombed The Temple on October 12, 1958, with no injuries. While arrests were made, there were no convictions. Atlanta Journal-Constitution editor Ralph McGill's outraged front-page column on the Temple bombing won a Pulitzer Prize for Editorial Writing. The Temple and the bombing event was used as a central theme in the film Driving Miss Daisy (1989).
