= Alice through the Looking Glass (1998 film) =

1998 British TV film

- Based on: Through the Looking-Glass by Lewis Carroll
- Screenplay by: Nick Vivian
- Directed by: John Henderson
- Starring: Kate Beckinsale; Ian Holm; Siân Phillips; Geoffrey Palmer
- Theme music composer: Dominik Scherrer
- Country of origin: United Kingdom
- Original language: English

Production
- Producers: Trevor Eve, Simon Johnson and Paul Frift
- Cinematography: John Ignatius
- Editor: David Yardley
- Running time: 83 minutes
- Production companies: Projector Productions; Channel 4

Original release
- Network: Channel 4
- Release: 26 December 1998

Alice through the Looking Glass is a 1998 British fantasy television film, based on Lewis Carroll's 1871 book Through the Looking-Glass, and starring Kate Beckinsale.

The film was released on DVD in 2005.

== Plot ==
The film opens with a mother reading Through the Looking Glass to her daughter, Alice. The mother then finds herself travelling through the bedroom mirror into Looking-Glass Land and becoming Alice, but remains an adult.

Alice finds a book containing "Jabberwocky", in mirror writing, and sees chess pieces coming to life. She goes out into a garden with talking flowers. There, she meets the Red Queen from the chess board, who shows her that the landscape is laid out like a gigantic chessboard. She will make Alice a queen if she can get as far as the eighth row. Alice becomes one of the White Queen's pawns, and gets into a train that takes her directly to the fourth row. In a wood, the Gnat teaches her about the looking-glass insects. In crossing the wood where things have no names, she forgets her own name, but it comes back on the other side. Next she meets Tweedledum and Tweedledee, who recite the poem "The Walrus and the Carpenter", with the Red King asleep under a tree. The brothers get ready to fight but run away, frightened by a giant crow.

The White Queen arrives and shows her powers of precognition. With her, Alice goes forward into the fifth row by crossing a stream in a rowing boat, but the Queen is then turned into the Sheep.

Alice enters the sixth row of the chess board by crossing another stream and meets Humpty Dumpty on his unbirthday, who teaches Alice about portmanteau words before falling off his wall. The White King, the king's horses and the king's men try to help Humpty.

Alice, still a white pawn, crosses yet another stream to enter the seventh row and finds herself in the land of the Red Knight, who tries to capture her, but the White Knight fights him off and leads her through a forest to the last stream, falling off his horse and reciting the poem Haddocks' Eyes. This stream is not much more than a ditch, and Alice can step across it into the eighth row, when a queen's crown appears on her head. She is joined by both the Red and White Queens, who use word play to baffle her. They issue invitations to a coronation party to be hosted by Alice, but the party is chaotic, and Alice finds herself shaking the Red Queen to calm her down.

Alice wakes up safe at home with her daughter, little Alice.

== Cast ==
- Kate Beckinsale as Alice
- Siân Phillips as Red Queen
- Michael Medwin as Red King
- Greg Wise as Red Knight
- Geoffrey Palmer as White King
- Penelope Wilton as White Queen
- Ian Holm as White Knight
- Gary Olsen as Tweedle-Dum
- Marc Warren as Tweedle-Dee
- Steve Coogan as Gnat
- Ian Richardson as Wasp
- Desmond Barrit as Humpty Dumpty
- Jonathan Bailey as Lewis
- Charlotte Curley as Little Alice
- Rebecca Palmer as Rose
- Brian Gilks as Walrus
- John Cashen as Carpenter
- Louise J. Taylor as Tiger Lily
- Rebecca R. Palmer as Rose
- Paulette Williams as Daisy 1
- Tanya Luternauer as Daisy 2
- Jasper Holmes as Man in Paper Suit
- John Tordoff as Railway Guard

== Production ==
Apart from the innovation that Alice is played by an adult (she answers “seven and a half” when asked her age), the screenplay follows the text of the book closely, preserving Carroll's dialogue almost word for word. However, in another new element, Alice's hair style and her dress change throughout the film.

Unusually, the "Wasp in a Wig" episode, which Carroll wrote but did not leave in the book as published, is included in the film, with the Wasp played by Ian Richardson.

== Reception ==
Critics Jaques and Giddens commented that "The genial rendition overall makes for a pleasant film aimed at children, with a strong sense that Alice has a fun time in her adventure." Film scholar Thomas Leitch, comparing John Tenniel's influence on popular images of Alice with Carroll's own, comments that "The stars who least resemble Tenniel's Alice are Kate Beckinsale, ... and dark-haired, plump-faced Tina Majorino in Nick Willing's 1999 adaptation for NBC television."
