= The Adventures of Alice =

1960 TV play based on Lewis Carroll's Alice in Wonderland

- Genre: Family drama
- Created by: Lewis Carroll
- Based on: Alice's Adventures in Wonderland
- Written by: Lewis Carroll, Charles Lefeaux
- Directed by: Charles Lefeaux
- Starring: Sonia Dresdel; Marian Spencer; Ernest Milton; Peter Sallis; Gillian Ferguson; Gordon Davies; Cyril Shaps
- Composer: Antony Hopkins
- Country of origin: United Kingdom

Production
- Producer: Charles Lefeaux
- Editor: John Nash
- Running time: 55 Minutes
- Production company: BBC

Original release
- Network: BBC Television
- Release: 23 December 1960

The Adventures of Alice is a 1960 TV play starring Sonia Dresdel as the evil Red Queen. It was made by BBC Television and screened on 23 December 1960.

== Plot ==
The play is based on the books Alice's Adventures in Wonderland (1865) and Through the Looking-Glass (1871) by Lewis Carroll.

== Cast ==
- Sonia Dresdel as Red Queen
- Marian Spencer as White Queen
- Ernest Milton as The Mad Hatter
- Peter Sallis as Tweedledee
- Gillian Ferguson as Alice
- Gordon Davies as Lewis Carroll
- Cyril Shaps as the March Hare
- Carla Challoner as The Dormouse
- Arthur Ridley as The Gryphon, The Unicorn
- Eric Shilling as The Mock Turtle
- Erik Chitty as The Caterpillar, The Lion
- Barrie Cookson as Tweedledum
- Frederick Treves as Red King
- Vivienne Chatterton as The Sheep
- David March as Humpty Dumpty
- Philip Ray as White King
- Geoffrey Bayldon as White Knight
- John Murray Scott as The Creature with a Long Beak

== Production ==
Following the success of Antony Hopkins' opera "Hands Across the Sky", the BBC commissioned him and Charles Lefeaux to write the opera The Adventures of Alice based on the stories by Lewis Carroll.

== Reception ==
Mary Crosier wrote in The Guardian about "the dreamlike fantasy" but called the production "curiously uneven". The film received praise from critics and audiences when it was released on 23 December 1960, and so it was shown again on television on 7 August 1961. It now lies in the BBC Archives.
