= Alice Through the Looking Glass (2016 film) =

Film by James Bobin

- Theatrical release poster
- Directed by: James Bobin
- Written by: Linda Woolverton
- Based on: Characters by Lewis Carroll
- Produced by: Joe Roth; Suzanne Todd; Jennifer Todd; Tim Burton
- Starring: Johnny Depp; Anne Hathaway; Mia Wasikowska; Rhys Ifans; Helena Bonham Carter; Sacha Baron Cohen; Alan Rickman; Stephen Fry; Michael Sheen; Timothy Spall
- Cinematography: Stuart Dryburgh
- Edited by: Andrew Weisblum
- Music by: Danny Elfman
- Production companies: Walt Disney Pictures; Roth Films; Team Todd; Tim Burton Productions
- Distributed by: Walt Disney Studios; Motion Pictures
- Release dates: May 10, 2016 (London); May 27, 2016 (United States)
- Running time: 113 minutes
- Country: United States
- Language: English
- Budget: $170 million
- Box office: $300 million

Alice Through the Looking Glass is a 2016 American fantasy adventure film produced by Walt Disney Pictures. The sequel to Alice in Wonderland (2010), it was directed by James Bobin and written by Linda Woolverton. Johnny Depp, Anne Hathaway, Mia Wasikowska, Helena Bonham Carter, Alan Rickman (in his final film role), Stephen Fry, Michael Sheen, and Timothy Spall reprise their roles from the previous film, with Sacha Baron Cohen and Rhys Ifans joining the cast.

In the film, a now 22-year-old Alice comes across a magical looking glass that takes her back to Wonderland, where she finds that the Mad Hatter is acting madder than usual and wants to discover the truth about his family.

Alice Through the Looking Glass premiered on May 10, 2016 at the Odeon Leicester Square in London, and was theatrically released on May 27, by Walt Disney Studios Motion Pictures. The film received mixed-to-negative reviews from critics, who praised its visuals but criticized its story. It was also a box-office disappointment, grossing $300 million against a budget of $170 million and losing the studio an estimated $70 million.

== Plot ==
For 3 years, Alice Kingsleigh has been following her father's footsteps and sailing the high seas. Returning to London from China, she learns that her ex-fiancé Hamish Ascot has taken over the company (following his father's passing) and plans to have Alice sign over her father's ship in exchange for her family home.

Alice follows a butterfly she recognizes as Absolem, who was previously a caterpillar, and returns to Wonderland through a mirror. Alice is greeted by the White Queen, the White Rabbit, the Tweedles, Mallymkun, the March Hare, Bayard and the Cheshire Cat, who reveal that the Hatter is acting madder than usual (but this time: growing darker, less dafter, and denying himself laughter) due to his family having been gone after the Horunvendush Day attack from the Jabberwocky.

Alice tries to console the Hatter, but he remains certain that his family is still alive and must have survived. Later seeing it as the only way to restore his health, the White Queen sends Alice to consult Time and convince him to let her save the Hatter's family in the past, and also warns her that history will be destroyed if a person's past and present selves meet. In Time's Castle of Eternity lies the Chronosphere, an object that controls all of time in Wonderland. After Time tells Alice that altering the past is impossible, she steals the Chronosphere and travels back in time.

The banished Red Queen orders Time to pursue Alice, who Time then pushes to the Red Queen's crowning. There, a younger Mad Hatter mocks the Red Queen when the crown does not fit her abnormal head. When her father deems her unfit to rule, the Red Queen throws a tantrum that causes her head to grow big and then swears to wreak the worst vengeance on the Hatter. Alice learns of an event in both the Queens' pasts that causes friction between the two and travels back in time again to Fell Day, hoping to change the Red Queen's character.

The young White Queen steals a tart from her mother and leaves crumbs under her sister's bed. When confronted by their mother, the White Queen lies and lets her sister take the blame, causing the young Red Queen to run out of the castle in tears. Alice sees her about to run into a clock being carried across the square; believing this to be the event that changes her head, she pushes the clock out of the way. However, the young Red Queen still falls and hits her head. Alice is then confronted by a weakened Time, who berates her for putting all of time in danger and needs the Chronosphere back to the Grand Clock. She then runs into a nearby mirror and back into the real world, where she wakes up in a mental hospital, diagnosed with female hysteria. With the help of her mother, she returns to Wonderland, travels back in time to Horunvendush Day that involved the Jabberwocky attack and discovers that the Hatter's family was captured by the Red Queen's Red Knights.

Returning to the present, Alice sees that the Mad Hatter is at the brink of death. After Alice urges him to wake up, and tearfully says that she should have believed him and apologizes, the Hatter then awakens and reforms back to his normal self and declares himself to find the Red Queen and return his own family back home. The Wonderlanders then go to the Red Queen's second castle and find the Hatter's family, who had been waiting for him for a long time, shrunk down and trapped in an ant farm. The Red Queen later apprehends them and steals the Chronosphere from Alice, taking her sister back to Fell Day, when she lied about the tart, to hide behind a door and listen to the scene. The White Queen whispers "No.", as her younger self denies stealing the tart; the Red Queen furiously bursts through the door and angrily screams and deems the younger self a liar at her sister's younger self. The young Red Queen sees her older self, creating a time paradox/breaking the past, and their faces and bodies rust. All of Wonderland then begins to be taken over by the rust, with spikes forming.

Using the Chronosphere, Alice and the Hatter race back to the present, where Alice runs for her life to place the Chronosphere back in its original place. Initially, she outruns the rust, but is stopped with her hand just above the stand. Sparks make the connection and the rust dissolves. The Mad Hatter reunites with his family, while the White Queen apologizes to the redeemed Red Queen for lying. Alice bids her friends farewell and returns to the real world.

Upon Alice's return, her mother refuses to turn Alice's ship over to Hamish. Alice and her mother start their own company and travel on its behalf.

== Cast ==
- Mia Wasikowska as Alice Kingsleigh
- Johnny Depp as Tarrant Hightopp / Mad Hatter
  - Louis Ashbourne Serkis as young Tarrant Hightopp
- Anne Hathaway as Mirana / White Queen
  - Amelia Crouch as young Mirana
- Helena Bonham Carter as Iracebeth / Red Queen
  - Leilah de Meza as young Iracebeth
- Sacha Baron Cohen as Time, a powerful god-like human/clockwork hybrid who rules over all of time "himself" in Wonderland using the Chronosphere in a castle of eternity.
- Leo Bill as Hamish Ascot, now "Lord Ascot" following his father's death.
- Matt Lucas as Tweedledee and Tweedledum
- Lindsay Duncan as Helen Kingsleigh, Alice's mother.
- Geraldine James as Lady Ascot, Hamish's mother.
- Ed Speleers as James Harcourt, an employee of the Ascots.
- Andrew Scott as Dr. Addison Bennett, a cruel psychiatric doctor.
- Richard Armitage as King Oleron, Iracebeth and Mirana's father.
- Hattie Morahan as Queen Elsemere, Iracebeth and Mirana's mother and King Oleron's wife.
- Joanna Bobin as Alexandra Ascot, Hamish's wife and the new "Lady Ascot" following her marriage to the former.
- Rhys Ifans as Zanik Hightopp, the Mad Hatter's father.
- Simone Kirby as Tyva Hightopp, the Mad Hatter's mother.
- Eve Hedderwick Turner as Paloo Hightopp, the Mad Hatter's sister.
- Tom Godwin as Pimlick Hightopp, the Mad Hatter's brother.
- Siobhan Redmond as Bumalig Hightopp, the Mad Hatter's aunt.
- Frederick Warder as Poomally Hightopp, the Mad Hatter's uncle.
- Joe Hurst as Bim Hightopp, the Mad Hatter's cousin.
  - Oliver Hawkes as an infant Bim Hightopp.
- Stefan Kalipha as Maharaja (Uncredited)

=== Voice cast ===
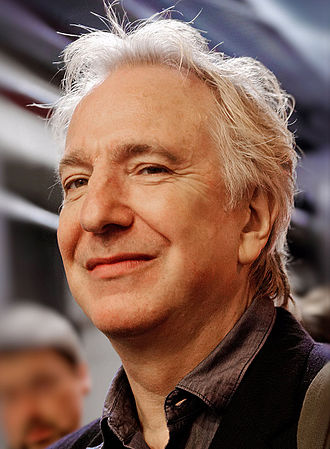
This film marks the last performance of actor Alan Rickman, who died four months before the film's release.

- Alan Rickman as Absolem the Butterfly
- Stephen Fry as Cheshire Cat
- Michael Sheen as Nivens McTwisp / White Rabbit
- Timothy Spall as Bayard Hamar / Bloodhound
  - Kyle Hebert as a puppy Bayard
- Barbara Windsor as Mallymkun the Dormouse
- Matt Vogel as Wilkins, Time's long-suffering manservant who leads his Seconds.
- Paul Whitehouse as Thackery Earwicket / March Hare
- Wally Wingert as Humpty Dumpty
- Meera Syal as Nobody
- Edward Petherbridge as Gentleman Fish
- Owain Rhys Davies as Delivery Frog
- Paul Hunter as White Chess King
- Andrew Sachs as Mantel Clock (Uncredited)

== Production ==
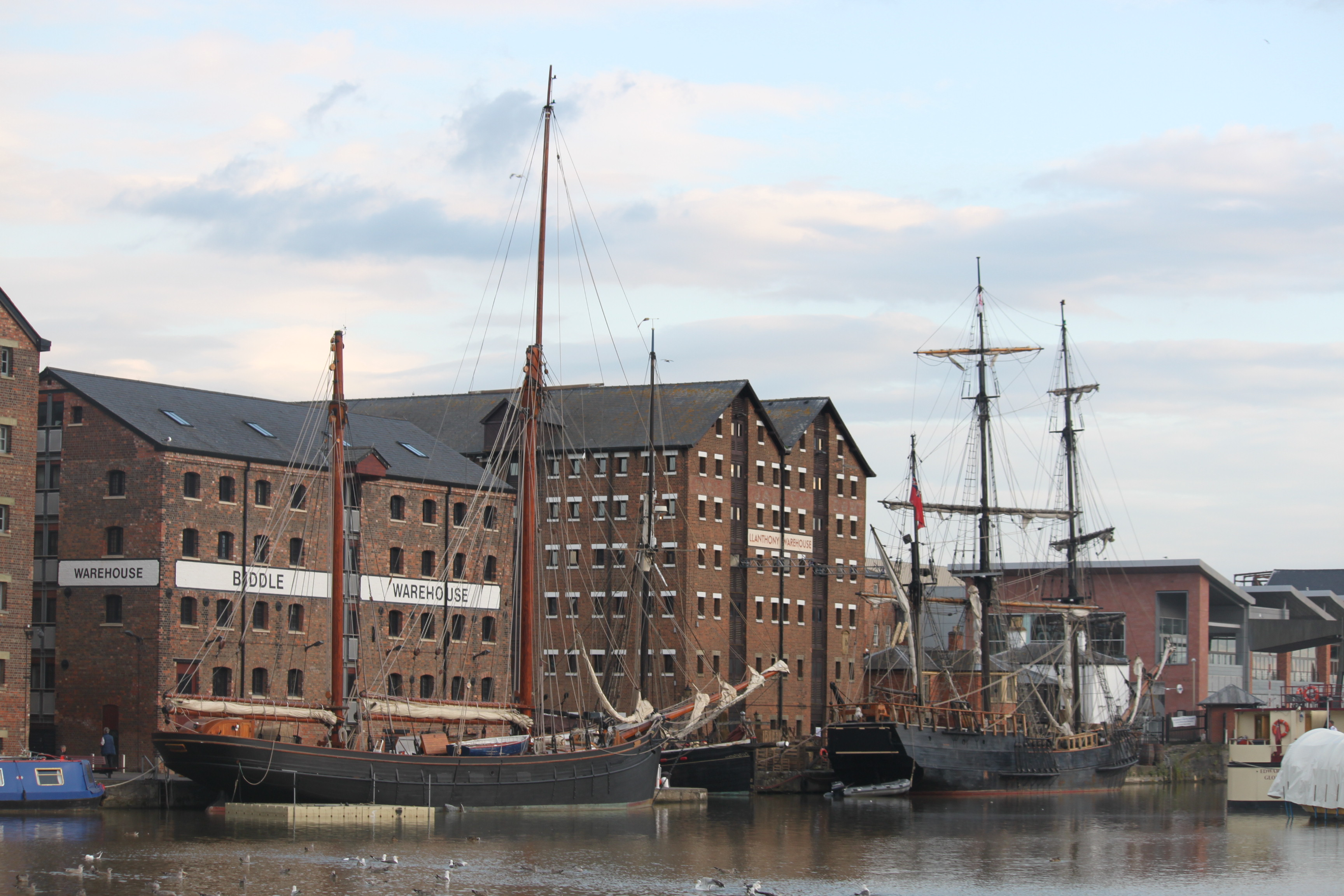
Tall ships in Gloucester Docks for the filming of Alice Through the Looking Glass. August 2014

=== Development ===
The film was announced via Variety in December 2012. Bobin was first approached about the project while doing post-production work on Disney's Muppets Most Wanted. Of being asked, Bobin has said that "I just couldn't pass it up", as he has a passion for the works of Lewis Carroll as well as history in general. On January 21, 2014, the film was again retitled to Alice in Wonderland: Through the Looking Glass.

=== Casting ===
In July 2013, it was announced that Johnny Depp would return as the Hatter, with Mia Wasikowska's return confirmed the following November. In January 2014, Sacha Baron Cohen joined the cast to play Time. In May 2014, Rhys Ifans joined the cast to play Zanik Hightopp, the Mad Hatter's father. In developing the character of "Time", Bobin sought to avoid creating a "straight-up bad guy", noting that it would be "a bit dull", and also that the role in that universe already existed in the form of the Red Queen. Instead, Bobin sought to make Time a "twit", further explaining that "there's no one better at playing the confident idiot trope than Sacha Baron Cohen", and adding that "it was very much with Sacha in mind". Additionally, Toby Jones and John Sessions were originally announced to voice Wilkins and Humpty Dumpty in the film; the roles were eventually given to Matt Vogel and Wally Wingert.

=== Filming ===
Principal photography began on August 4, 2014, at Shepperton Studios. In August 2014, filming took place in Gloucester Docks, which included the use of at least four historic ships: Kathleen and May, Irene, Excelsior, and the Earl of Pembroke, the last of which was renamed The Wonder for filming. Principal photography ended on October 31, 2014.

== Music ==
The film's score was composed by Danny Elfman. The soundtrack was released on May 27, 2016, by Walt Disney Records. Pink recorded the song "Just Like Fire" for the film, and also covered Jefferson Airplane's "White Rabbit", only used in the film's promotional material.

=== Track listing ===
All music composed by Danny Elfman.

No.	Title	Length
1.	"Alice"	6:35
2.	"Saving the Ship"	3:40
3.	"Watching Time"	5:10
4.	"Looking Glass"	3:30
5.	"To the Rescue"	0:56
6.	"Hatter House"	3:47
7.	"The Red Queen"	2:29
8.	"The Chronosphere"	4:15
9.	"Warning Hightopps"	2:23
10.	"Tea Time Forever"	1:45
11.	"Oceans of Time"	1:15
12.	"Hat Heartbreak"	2:27
13.	"Asylum Escape"	4:06
14.	"Hatter's Deathbed"	3:22
15.	"Finding the Family"	2:04
16.	"Time Is Up"	4:24
17.	"World's End"	1:50
18.	"Truth"	4:09
19.	"Goodbye Alice"	2:13
20.	"Kingsleigh & Kingsleigh"	1:19
21.	"Seconds Song"	0:11
22.	"Friends United"	1:06
23.	"Time's Castle"	1:49
24.	"The Seconds"	1:55
25.	"Clock Shop"	0:50
26.	"They're Alive"	2:23
27.	"Story of Time"	3:03
28.	"Just Like Fire" (performed by Pink)	3:35
Total length:		76:53

== Marketing ==
On May 11, 2016, Johnny Depp made a cameo appearance as Tarrant Hightopp at Disneyland to promote the film, surprising unsuspecting guests by portraying the Mad Hatter in place of one of the digitized character poster billboards.

== Release ==
Alice Through the Looking Glass premiered in London on May 10, 2016, and was theatrically released on May 27, 2016, in the United States by Walt Disney Pictures.

=== Box office ===
Alice Through the Looking Glass grossed $77 million in the United States and Canada and $222.4 million in other territories for a worldwide total of $299.5 million, against a production budget of $170 million. The Hollywood Reporter estimated the film lost the studio around $70 million, when factoring together all expenses and revenues.

Alice Through the Looking Glass opened in the United States and Canada on May 27, 2016, alongside X-Men: Apocalypse, and was initially projected to gross $55–60 million from 3,763 theaters over its four-day Memorial Day opening weekend, but projections were continuously revised downwards due to poor word of mouth. It had the added benefit of playing in over 3,100 3D theaters, 380 IMAX screens, 77 premium large formats and 79 D-box locations. It made $1.5 million from Thursday previews (to the first film's $3.9 million) and just $9.7 million on its first day, compared to the $41 million opening Friday of its predecessor. Through its opening weekend, it earned $26.9 million, which when compared to its predecessor's $116 million opening is down 70%. While 3D represented 71% ($82 million) of the original film's opening gross, 3D constituted only 41% ($11 million) for this sequel, with 29% coming from traditional 2D shows, 11% from IMAX, and 1% from premium large formats. It was the studio's third production with a low Memorial Day opening after Tomorrowland in 2015 and Prince of Persia: The Sands of Time in 2010. During its first week, the film grossed $40.1 million. In its second weekend, the film grossed $11.3 million (a 57.9% drop), finishing 4th at the box office.

The film was released across 43 countries (72% of its total market place) the same weekend as the US, and was estimated to gross $80–100 million in its opening weekend. It faced competition from Warcraft and X-Men: Apocalypse. It ended up grossing $62.7 million, which is well below the projections of which $4.1 million came from IMAX shows. It had an opening weekend gross in Mexico ($4.5 million), Brazil ($4.1 million), and Russia ($3.9 million). In the United Kingdom and Ireland, it had an unsuccessful opening by grossing just £2.23 million ($3.1 million) during its opening weekend, a mere 21% of the first film's £10.56 million ($15.2 million) opening from 603 theaters. It debuted in second place behind X-Men: Apocalypse which was on its second weekend of play. In China, it had an opening day of an estimated $7.3 million and went on to score the second biggest Disney live-action (non-Marvel or Lucasfilm) opening ever with $26.6 million, behind only The Jungle Book. However, this was down from its $35–45 million projections. It debuted at the No. 1 spot among newly released film in Japan with $5.2 million and $4.1 million on Saturday and Sunday. By comparison, the first film opened with $14 million on its way to a $133.6 million a total.

=== Home media ===
Alice Through the Looking Glass was released on Blu-ray, DVD, Blu-ray 3D and digital download on October 18, 2016, by Walt Disney Studios Home Entertainment. It debuted at No. 2 in the Blu-ray Disc sales charts.

== Reception ==
Rotten Tomatoes reports that 29% of 260 reviews are positive, and the average rating is 4.5/10. The website's critical consensus reads, "Alice Through the Looking Glass is just as visually impressive as its predecessor, but that isn't enough to cover for an underwhelming story that fails to live up to its classic characters." Metacritic, which uses a weighted average, assigned the film a score of 34 out of 100, based on 42 critics, indicating "generally unfavorable" reviews. However, audiences polled by CinemaScore gave the film an average grade of "A−" on an A+ to F scale, the same grade earned by its predecessor, while those at PostTrak gave it an overall positive score of 79% and a "definite recommend" of 51%.

Stephen Holden of The New York Times wrote in his review, "What does all this have to do with Lewis Carroll? Hardly anything" and that overall, "It's just an excuse on which to hang two trite overbearing fables and one amusing one". Ty Burr of The Boston Globe gave the movie 1.5 out of 4 stars and called the film, "gaudy, loud, complacent, and vulgar." Stephen Whitty of New York Daily News called the film "hugely expensive and extravagantly stupid" and that, overall, the movie "is just one more silly Hollywood mashup, an innocent fantasy morphed into a noisy would-be blockbuster". Matt Zoller Seitz of RogerEbert.com was deeply critical of Alice Through the Looking Glass, calling it "junk rehashed from a movie that was itself a rehash of Lewis Carroll" and describing it as "the most offensive kind of film" due to its blockbuster tropes, lack of magic and wonder, and perceived sole purpose of financial gain.

Matthew Lickona of San Diego Reader said that while he found the visual effects to be "stupidly expensive" and the story familiar, he called it "a solid kids' movie in the old style".

=== Accolades ===
Accolades received by Alice Through the Looking Glass (2016 film)
Award	Category	Recipient(s)	Result	Ref.
Golden Raspberry Awards	Worst Prequel, Remake, Rip-off or Sequel	Alice Through the Looking Glass	Nominated	
Golden Raspberry Awards	Worst Supporting Actor	Johnny Depp	Nominated	
Golden Raspberry Awards	Worst Screen Combo	Johnny Depp and His Vomitously Vibrant Costume	Nominated	
Golden Trailer Awards	Best Animation Family	"Poem"	Nominated	
Golden Trailer Awards	The Don LaFontaine Award for Best Voice Over	"Poem"	Nominated	
Golden Trailer Awards	Best Fantasy Adventure TV Spot	"Grammys"	Nominated	
Golden Trailer Awards	Best Original Score TV Spot	"Grammys"	Nominated	
Grammy Awards	Best Song Written For Visual Media	"Just Like Fire" – Oscar Holter, Max Martin, Pink and Shellback	Nominated	
Hollywood Music in Media Awards	Best Song – Sci-Fi/Fantasy Film	"Just Like Fire" – Oscar Holter, Max Martin, Pink and Shellback	Won	
People's Choice Awards	Favorite Family Movie	Alice Through the Looking Glass	Nominated	
Satellite Awards	Best Art Direction and Production Design	Dan Hennah	Nominated	
Satellite Awards	Best Costume Design	Colleen Atwood	Nominated	
Saturn Awards	Best Costume Design	Colleen Atwood	Nominated	
Teen Choice Awards	Choice Music: Song from a Movie or TV Show	"Just Like Fire" by Pink	Nominated	
Visual Effects Society Awards	Outstanding Effects Simulations in a Photoreal Feature	Jacob Clark, Joseph Pepper, Klaus Seitschek and Cosku Turhan	Nominated	
