= List of minor characters in the Alice series =

Characters in the books by Lewis Carroll

This is a list of the minor characters in Lewis Carroll's 1865 novel Alice's Adventures in Wonderland and its 1871 sequel, Through the Looking-Glass.

== Appearing in Alice's Adventures in Wonderland ==
=== Alice's sister ===
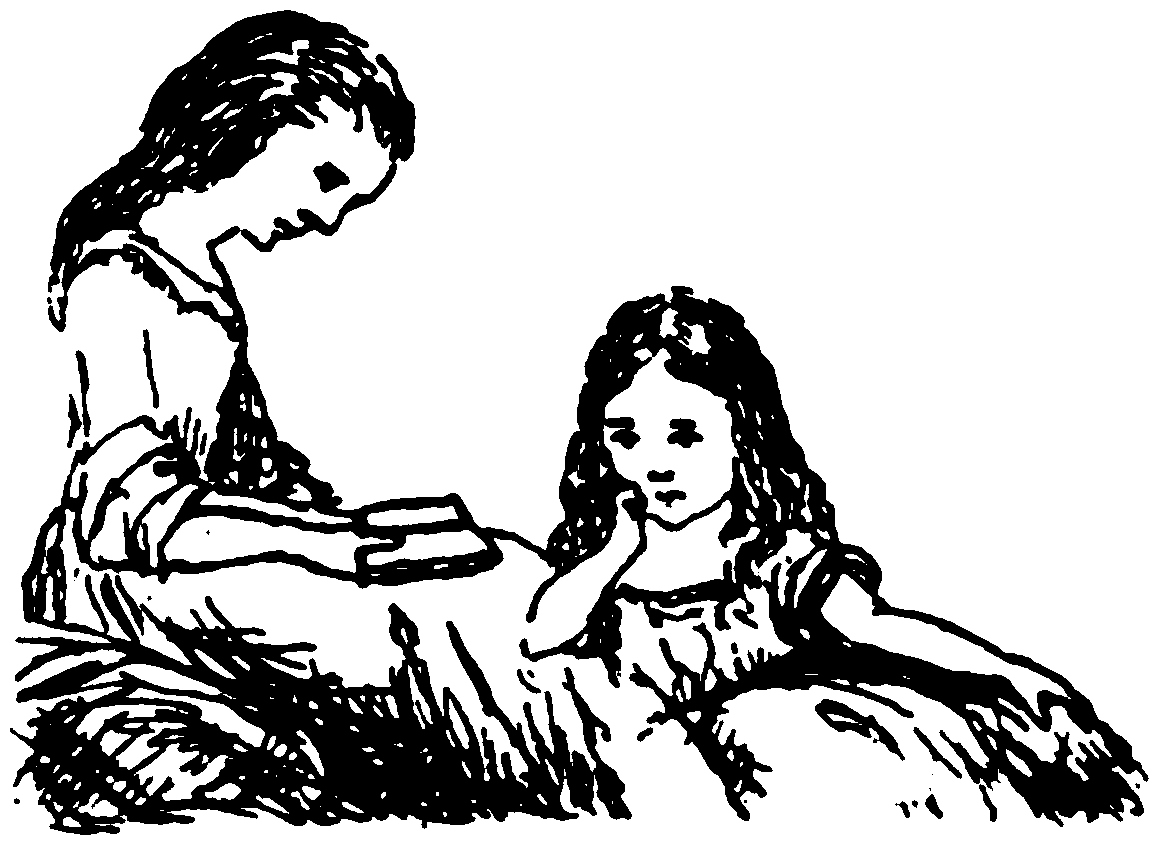
Alice's sister

Alice's unnamed older sister, who reads a book without illustrations or dialogues, sits on the bank with Alice at the beginning of the book. Alice falls asleep with her head in her sister's lap and has the dream about Wonderland. When Alice awakes, she tells her sister about her dream, and the book closes with her sister daydreaming about what Alice will be like as a grown-up.

Some believe that she is named Lorina after Alice's real-life sister.

In the Disney's film, Alice's sister (voiced by Heather Angel) was never named. She was named Mathilda in Disney's Alice in Wonderland Jr.

She is named Celia in the 1983 anime series and Ada in the 1995 Jetlag animated film.

In the 2010 film, she is married and her name is Margaret (portrayed by Jemma Powell).

In the Cashville series, a 10 year old Alice had an oldest sister named Irene Adler as she is a 25-year-old woman.

=== Dinah ===
Dinah is Alice's cat and bosom companion in Alice's Adventures in Wonderland and Through the Looking-Glass, and What Alice Found There. Alice talks to Dinah, and mentions her frequently to Wonderland residents. When Alice describes Dinah's hunting skills to the animals in the Caucus Race, they become very uncomfortable.

Dinah appears in the Disney film, and a descendant of her with the same name belonged to Alice's great-granddaughter that came to Wonderland and lived there in Alice's Wonderland Bakery.

=== The Duchess's Cook ===
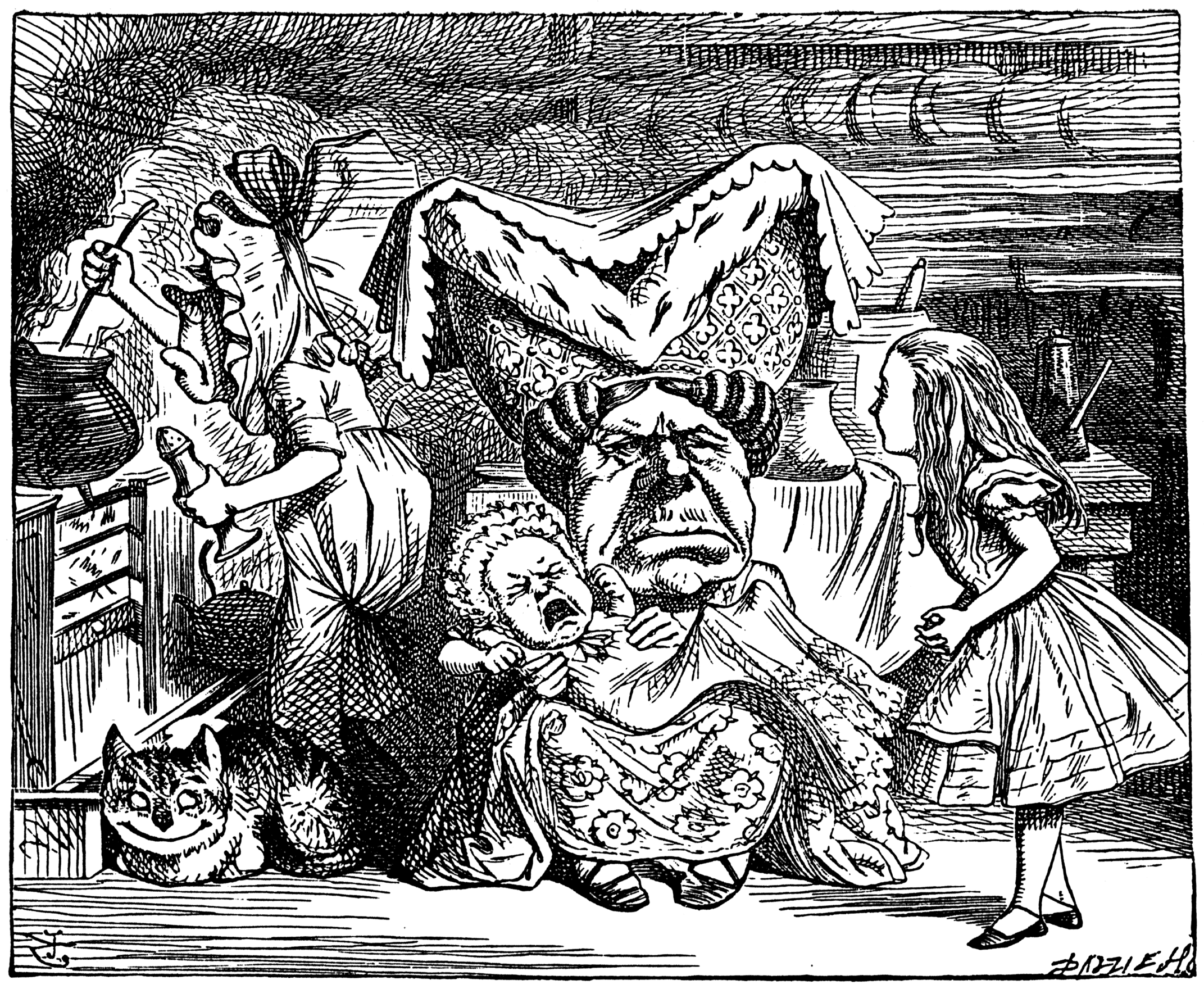
The Cook, The Pig Baby, and The Duchess

The ill-mannered, belligerent and volatile cook works as a servant to the Duchess. The copious amounts of pepper (which alludes to a quick temper) she uses in her soup cause Alice, the Duchess, and her son to sneeze incessantly. Her fury at being disrupted during her cooking is made clear when she throws various pots and pans, aiming to hit both Alice and the baby. She makes another brief appearance as a key witness at the Queen of Hearts's trial, where she claims that the stolen tarts were made with pepper.

The Cook appears in the 1999 film played by Sheila Hancock.

=== The Eaglet, the Lory, the Duck, and the Dodo ===
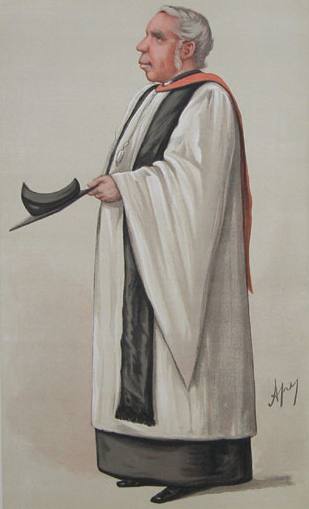
The Rev. Robinson Duckworth inspired Carroll

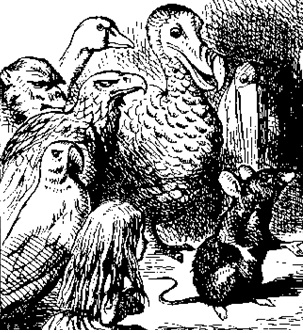
The Eaglet, the Duck, the Dodo, the Lory and others; illustration by John Tenniel

The Eaglet, the Lory, the Duck, and the Dodo are characters appearing in chapters two and three of Alice's Adventures in Wonderland.

Carroll incorporated references in his works to a group of his friends present on a boating outing on the River Thames which occurred on 4 July 1862. Carroll at the time was relating his newly forming story to the three girls, their family, and some friends. Alice Liddell became Alice; with the others represented by birds in these passages from the book. The Lory character was based on Lorina Charlotte Liddell, Alice's older sister reflecting on the Victorian era that older siblings had more power over the younger sibling. The Eaglet was also another sister, Edith Liddell; and the Duck was a caricature of Rev. Robinson Duckworth. The Dodo referenced Charles Lutwidge Dodgson (Carroll) himself.

It began to rain during the outing, and the group left for a nearby house. As they walked, only Alice, Lorina, and Edith could keep up. Carroll and the sisters got there first, as they walked the fastest. According to The Annotated Alice, Carroll had originally had the characters dry off by having the Dodo lead them to a nearby house for towels. Carroll ultimately replaced this scene in the book with the "Caucus race", as he felt that the original story would have been funny only to the people familiar with the incident.

The Dodo appears in the 1951 Disney film, though the Eaglet, the Lory and the Duck do not appear. A family of horn-shaped ducks that are seen in the Tulgey Wood appear in the film. The characters rarely appear in adaptations.

=== The Executioner ===
He is the royal Executioner of the King and Queen of Hearts. The Queen of Hearts ordered the Cheshire Cat to be decapitated, but the Executioner argued that he couldn't because the Cat lacked a body to decapitate. This led to an argument between the Queen, the King and the Executioner about whether or not a disembodied head could be decapitated. The Executioner then argued that the Cat belonged to the Duchess, so he couldn't behead it without her permission. He is most commonly depicted as a playing card (similar to the Card painters) and his suit is clubs, though he has also been a spade, a heart and, in American McGee's Alice, a joker.

In the 1951 film, several of the Card Soldiers in the Queen's court are executioners. They are all spades, rather than clubs, and carry axes. As are all of the Card Soldiers they are voiced by Don Barclay and Larry Grey.

In Tim Burton's 2010 film, the executioner is an assassin working for the Red Queen, rather than the Queen of Hearts. He made a brief appearance in the film, where he was assigned to behead the Mad Hatter. Before executing him, the Executioner wanted to remove his hat, but when the Hatter insisted that he wanted to keep it on, he agreed when as long as he could get at his neck. When he swings his axe, it hit the block instead of the neck of the Mad Hatter, as it was the Cheshire Cat in disguise as the Hatter. As the Cheshire Cat floats away with Hatter's hat, the Executioner looks as shocked as other inhabitants of the Red Queen's court. Soon after that, the Red Queen ordered for her courtiers to be executed. Whether the Executioner actually ended their lives or not is unknown. In the film, the Executioner uses a heart shaped axe, hinting his suit is hearts. The Executioner was voiced by the English actor Jim Carter. The executioner is the only humanoid character, in the film, to be completely CGI and he speaks only one line in the entire film. He wears a long grey cloak and a hood that covers his face.

The Executioner appears as an enemy in the video game Alice: Madness Returns. He stays in the Queen's castle and is completely invulnerable to any of Alice's attacks. He has the appearance of an extremely large humanoid made of several different Card Guard parts, each piece of his sewn-together body showing a symbol of a certain suit of a card deck. The top of his head is masked by a large horned hat, and several of the Queen's tentacles are wrapped around the top of his body, even going through his eye sockets. On his is head is what looks like a jester's hat and all Card colors may imply that Executioner is a Joker Card (hence its special abilities), but it is not confirmed.

=== Fish Footman ===
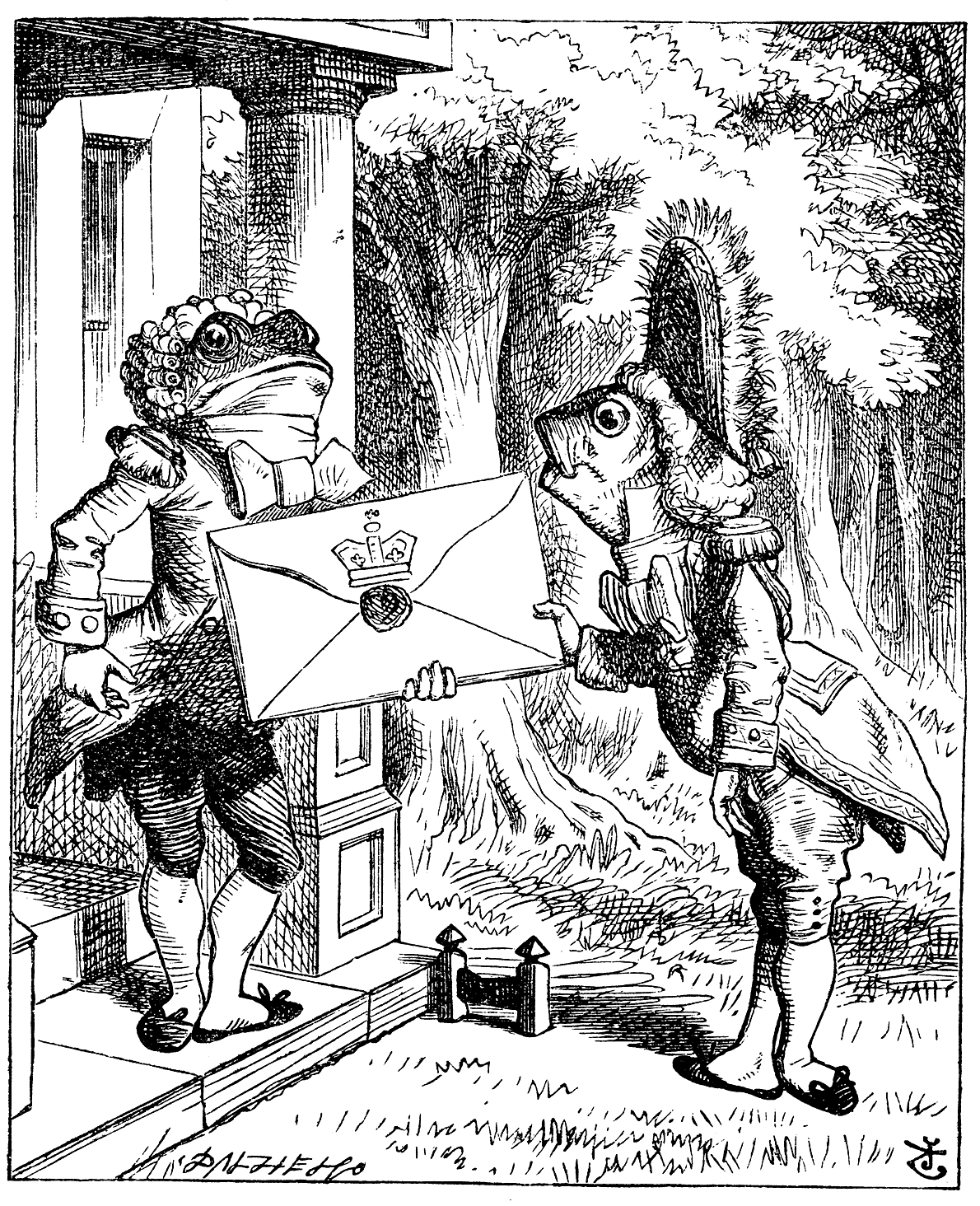
The Fish and Frog Footmen

In Lewis Carroll's novel Alice's Adventures in Wonderland, the Fish Footman delivers a croquet invitation from the Queen of Hearts to the Duchess's Frog Footman, which he then delivers to the Duchess.

In Tim Burton's 2010 remake of Alice in Wonderland, the Red Queen has a Fish Footman working in her castle as a butler. Both the Frog Footmen and the Fish Footman have been shown in a featurette for Tim Burton's adaptation, which premiered March 5, 2010.

A gentleman fish appears in the sequel Alice Through the Looking Glass, voiced by Edward Petherbridge.

=== Frog Footman ===
An anthropomorphic frog with a bow tie and white hair who serves as a footman to The Duchess. He received a letter from a fish-footman to give it to the duchess.

The Frog Footman does not appear in Walt Disney's 1951 film, though there is a drum frog with a detached green head and green legs and a cymbal frog with eyes on top and blue legs in the Tulgey Wood.

In the 2010 film, there are multiple Frog Footmen who work for the Red Queen. One of them was about to be executed for eating the queen's tarts as he was too hungry.

A delivery frog appears in the sequel Alice Through the Looking Glass, voiced by Owain Rhys Davies.

=== Mary Ann ===
The White Rabbit's housemaid. Alice is mistaken for her. She does not appear at all and is only mentioned.

=== The Pig Baby ===
The Pig Baby is mentioned in Chapter 6 of Alice's Adventures in Wonderland, titled "Pig and Pepper." When Alice enters the Duchess's house, she sees the Duchess holding a human baby, as shown in John Tenniel's illustration. The baby is wailing and sneezing due to the pepper particles in the air. The Duchess then goes on to sing "Speak Roughly to your little boy", shaking the baby wildly and adding to the already chaotic scene in the house. The Duchess flings the baby at Alice who catches it and then walks outside. She starts to realize that the baby is not really human after all, since it starts to grow pig ears and a turned-up nose. Alice finally sets down the pig, as it then scurries off into the woods.

=== Puppy ===
Puppy
- Alice character
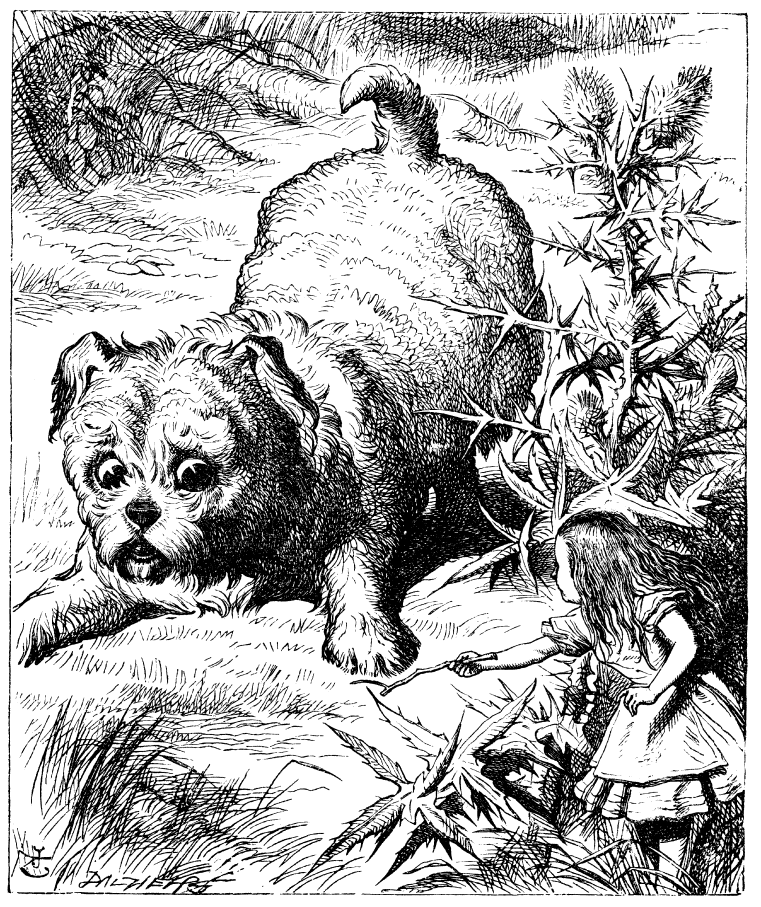
- Alice encounters the Puppy
- First appearance: Alice's Adventures in Wonderland
- Last appearance: Alice Through the Looking Glass
- Voiced by: Timothy Spall (2010; Adult); Kyle Hebert (2016; Young)

In-universe information
- Alias: Bayard Hamar
- Nicknames: The Bloodhound; The Dog

The Puppy appears in the chapter "The Rabbit Sends a Little Bill".

In the book, when Alice shrinks to a tiny size, and escapes into the White Rabbit's garden, she finds the Puppy (now apparently enormous to her, but actually a normal sized dog) and briefly plays with him, and compares it to "a game of play with a cart-horse, and expecting every moment to be trampled under his feet". At the conclusion of the game, she leaves him, with a slight regret of the necessity to do so.

==== Tim Burton version ====
In the 2010 film, the Puppy has become a bloodhound named Bayard: voiced by Timothy Spall and forced to hunt for Alice by the Knave of Hearts. Bayard tracks Alice to the tea party held by the Mad Hatter, March Hare, and Dormouse, where the Hatter hides her in a teapot and tells Bayard to lead the knights away, which he does. Some time afterwards, he finds Alice again under the Mad Hatter's hat, and takes her to the Red Queen's castle by Alice's own request, where she arranges to rescue the Mad Hatter from the Queen's captivity. After her failure there, Bayard leads Alice to the White Queen's castle, while she rides the Bandersnatch.

Bayard returns in the 2016 sequel, Alice Through the Looking Glass, again voiced by Spall. The young version of the character is voiced by Kyle Hebert.

=== Time ===
Time is a character mentioned by the Mad Hatter whom he had a quarrel with. The Hatter told Alice that when he performed badly for the Queen of Hearts, she demanded his execution for "murdering the time", to which he successfully escapes. However Time took offense to the performance and the Queen's accusation, which promotes him to punish the Hatter, the March Hare and the Dormouse to be stuck exactly at 6:00 pm, forcing them to have a never-ending tea party.

Time makes a physical appearance in Disney's Alice Through the Looking Glass film, portrayed by Sacha Baron Cohen. He is characterized as a keeper of time in Wonderland, looking after the Chronosphere and maintain the lifespans of the residents with pocket watches.

=== The Playing Cards ===
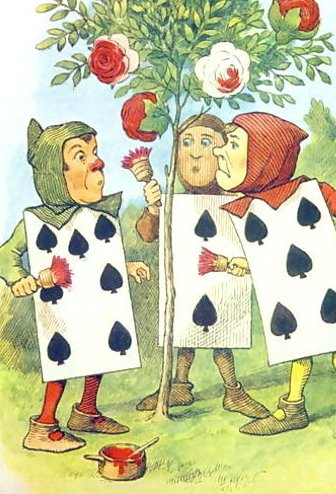
The Playing Cards

They are playing cards with a human head, arms and legs. The playing cards are loyal servants as well as guards for the Queen of Hearts. They mainly carry spears with the tip shaped as a heart. Alice first meets three cards at the Queen's castle painting white roses red. One of them explains that they accidentally planted white roses, and because the Queen hates white roses they have to paint them red or the Queen will behead them. After the Queen arrives, she finds white roses and orders the execution of all three. Alice declares that they "shan't be beheaded" and hides them in a flowerpot. Their would-be executioners spend a minute or two looking for them before giving up. When Alice joins a game of croquet with the Queen and the other playing cards, the card soldiers act as arches. They have to leave being arches every time the Queen has an executioner drag the victim away. They also appear in the trial where the Knave of Hearts is accused for stealing the Queen's tarts.

The Playing Cards also appear in the 1951 Alice in Wonderland animated film as playing cards with masks shaped like card symbols that match their spears and gloves. Three of the Playing Cards were first seen by Alice painting roses on white rose bushes red until the Queen had them taken away to be beheaded for painting her roses red. They also march as they chase Alice even over the hedges of the labyrinth. They are voiced by The Mellomen, Don Barclay and Larry Grey. The Playing Cards also appeared in House of Mouse voiced by Corey Burton.

They appear in the 2010 film as playing cards with red armor that covers their body, masks and shoulder plates shaped like hearts, and spears with tips shaped like hearts. There are no cards of spades, clubs or diamonds, for only cards of hearts appear in this film. They are called "Red Knights" and serve the Red Queen.

They appear in the video game, American McGee's Alice where they carry axes and bow guns.

In the novel The Looking Glass Wars, they appear as robots with their outer layer shaped as cards and spears. They can fly while in card form and can walk as well as spear in soldier form. They work for Queen Redd, the main antagonist of the series.

In the otome game Alice in the Country of Hearts (Heart no Kuni no Alice), they are humans with card-marked uniforms that have different numbers for each servant and British hats. There appear to be female versions of these as well.

=== Tortoise ===
Tortoise is the Mock Turtle's teacher. He does not appear, but is only mentioned. He is a sea turtle and when Alice asks why he was called Tortoise if he was a turtle, the Mock Turtle replies with a play on words; "We called him tortoise because he taught us!"

== Appearing in Alice Through the Looking-Glass ==
=== Returning characters – Dinah, Alice's sister, Frog Footman, Hatter, Hare ===
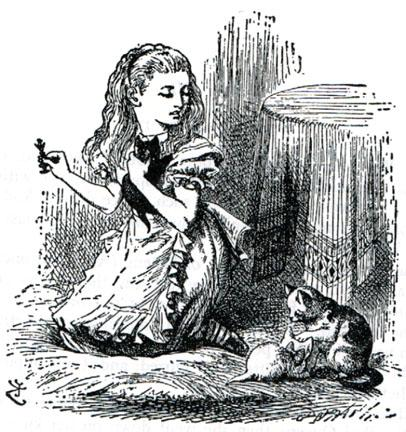
Dinah, Alice's cat, in an illustration from Through the Looking-Glass

Several characters from the original book, other than Alice, appear. The most prominent is Dinah who reappears now the mother of two kittens. She assumes the role of Humpty Dumpty. Though Alice's sister does not appear, she is briefly mentioned. The Frog Footman makes a minor reappearance as a gardener. The Hatter and the Hare also reappear as messengers for the White King, renamed Hatta and Haigha, "one to come, and one to go". Haigha is notable for adopting "Anglo-Saxon attitudes", referring to a ninth- to eleventh-century style in English drawing, in which the figures are shown in swaying positions with the palms held out in exaggerated positions.

=== Kitty ===
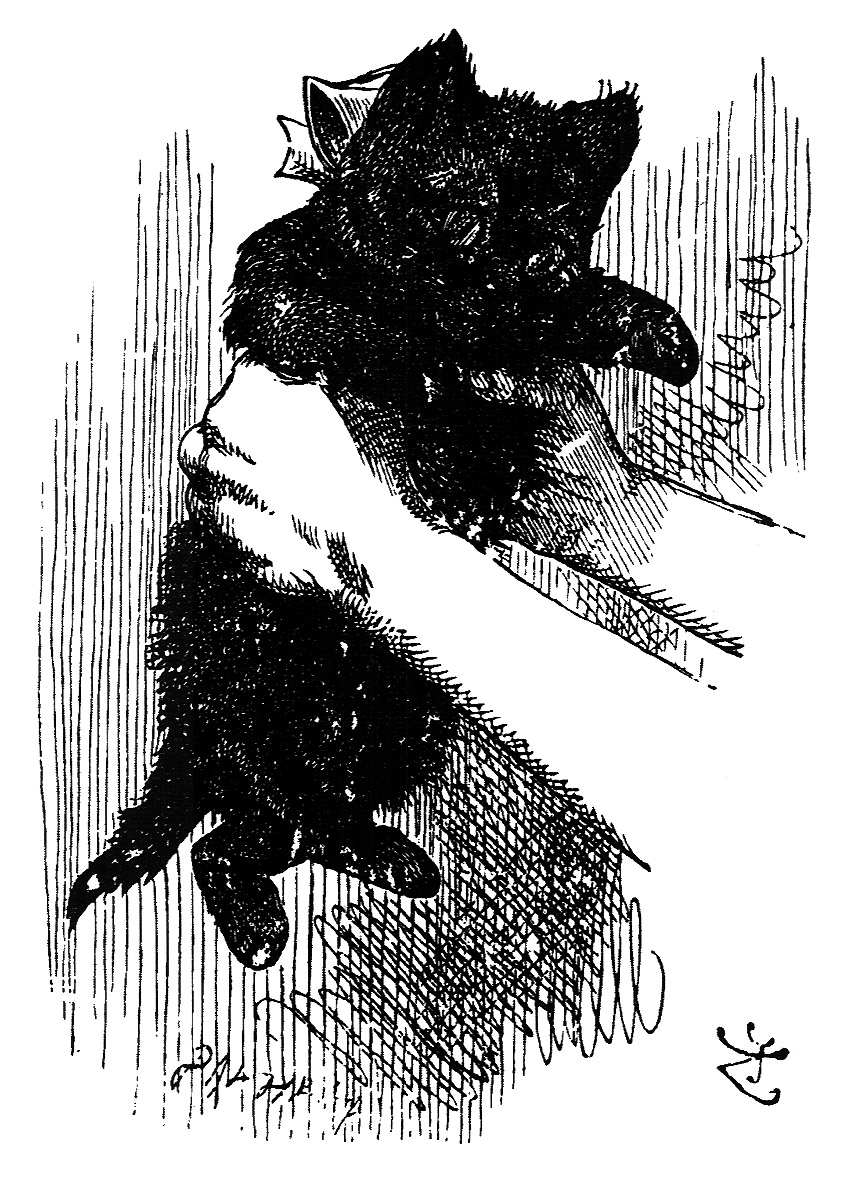
Kitty, the black kitten

Kitty is Dinah's black kitten and a character of the Lewis Carroll's novel Through The Looking-Glass and What Alice Found There. Kitty, who assumes the role of the Red Queen, appears in chapters I and XII.

=== Snowdrop ===
Snowdrop is Dinah's white kitten and a character of Lewis Carroll's novel Through The Looking-Glass and What Alice Found There. Snowdrop, who assumes the role of the White Queen, appears in chapters I and XII.

=== Nobody ===
A character the White King mentions when Alice says "I see nobody on the road". Considering how the king refers to Nobody like a person he was familiar with, it suggests that the king actually knew somebody named Nobody.

Nobody appears in Alice Through the Looking Glass, voiced by Meera Syal.

=== Talking Flowers ===
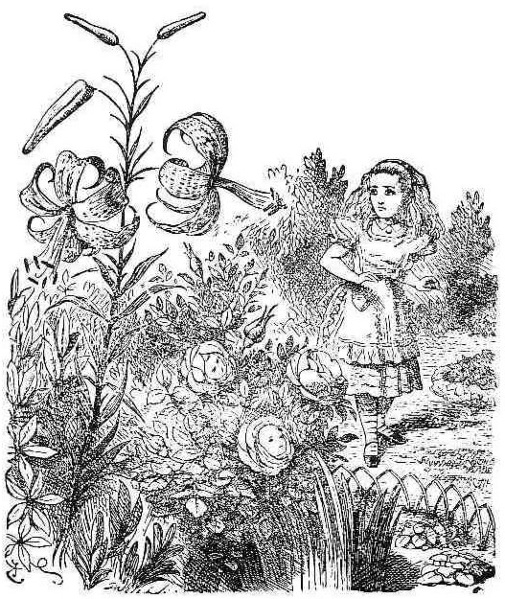
The Talking Flowers

The flowers Alice meet include a tiger-lily, a rose, a iris, pansies, tulips, lilac, daffodils, sunflowers, dandelions, daisies, a violet, blue bonnets, sweet peas, thistle, calla and lilies of the valley, morning glories, lazy daisies, and a larkspur. Alice first meets them in the garden, where they mistake her for a type of flower that can move. The one Alice first makes contact with is a tiger-lily, who sets the other flowers straight. When Alice asks if they are frightened when no one takes care of them, the rose tells her that the tree in the middle is there. The daisies tell her that it says "Bough-wough", which is why branches are called boughs. Then all of them make shrill voices and don't stop until Alice whispers that she will pick them if they don't hold their tongues. The violet rudely tells Alice that she had never seen anyone looked stupider, of course, she had never seen anybody herself as explained by the tiger-lily. The rose tells her there is another flower that can move like her and looks like her but that she is redder, her petals are shorter, and she wears her thorns on her head. The larkspur hears this flower on the gravel-walk. Alice discovers that the red flower is the Red Queen, her hair the petals and thorns the points of her crown. Alice leaves the flowers to meet the Queen. Some of the flowers are pawns with the daisies being both red and white, while the tiger-lily and the rose are red.

In 1998, the minor planet 17768 Tigerlily was named after tiger-lily.

In the Disney film, Alice meets them just before she meets the Caterpillar. They sing her a song called the "Golden Afternoon", from "All in the golden afternoon...". They are voiced by Doris Lloyd (who voices the Rose), Lucille Bliss (who voices the Tulips), Queenie Leonard (who voices the Snooty Iris), Marni Nixon (who voices the unnamed flowers), Norma Zimmer (who voices the White Rose), and Jimmy and Tommy Luske (who voice the Young Pansies).

The flowers reappeared in the 1985 TV movie. Performers included Sally Struthers as the tiger-lily and Donna Mills as the rose.

They were also among the Looking Glass land characters to appear in the 1999 film, with Joanna Lumley voicing the tiger-lily.

They also appear in the 2010 movie. They are voiced by Imelda Staunton, whose head was filmed and digitally added to the Flower Heads.

Two flowers, the daffodils and the pansies, appear in second special of The Wonderful World of Mickey Mouse: "The Wonderful Spring of Mickey Mouse".

=== Red Knight ===
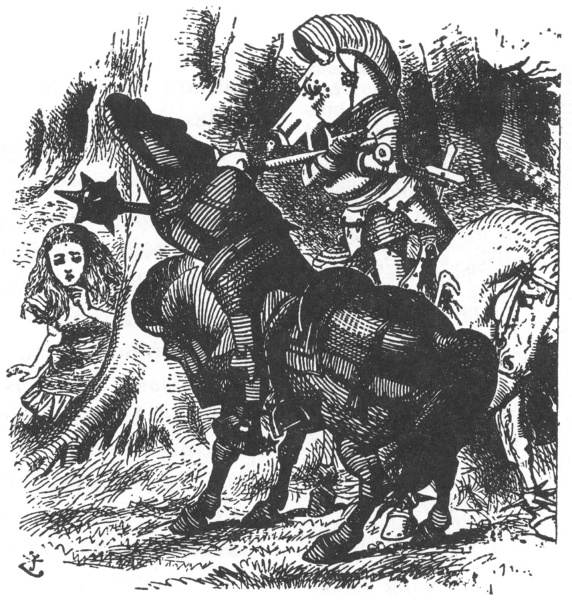
The Red Knight

The Knight comes across Alice while riding through a wood at the start of chapter VIII. He attempts to capture her for the Red side, but then the White Knight suddenly appears and exclaims that he has rescued her. They decide to fight over her, in the manner according to Looking-glass world's bizarre "Rules of Battle." Alice remarks to herself that these rules seem to be: (1) "if one Knight hits the other, he knocks him off his horse, and if he misses, he tumbles off himself", (2) both combatants must "hold their clubs with their arms, as if they were Punch and Judy", and (3) both combatants must always fall on their heads. The contests ends when both knights fall from their horses and the White is inexplicably decided the victor. They shake hands and then the Red mounts and gallops away. He is the Red King's knight.

Actors who have portrayed him onscreen include Don Matheson and Greg Wise.

=== Train Passengers ===
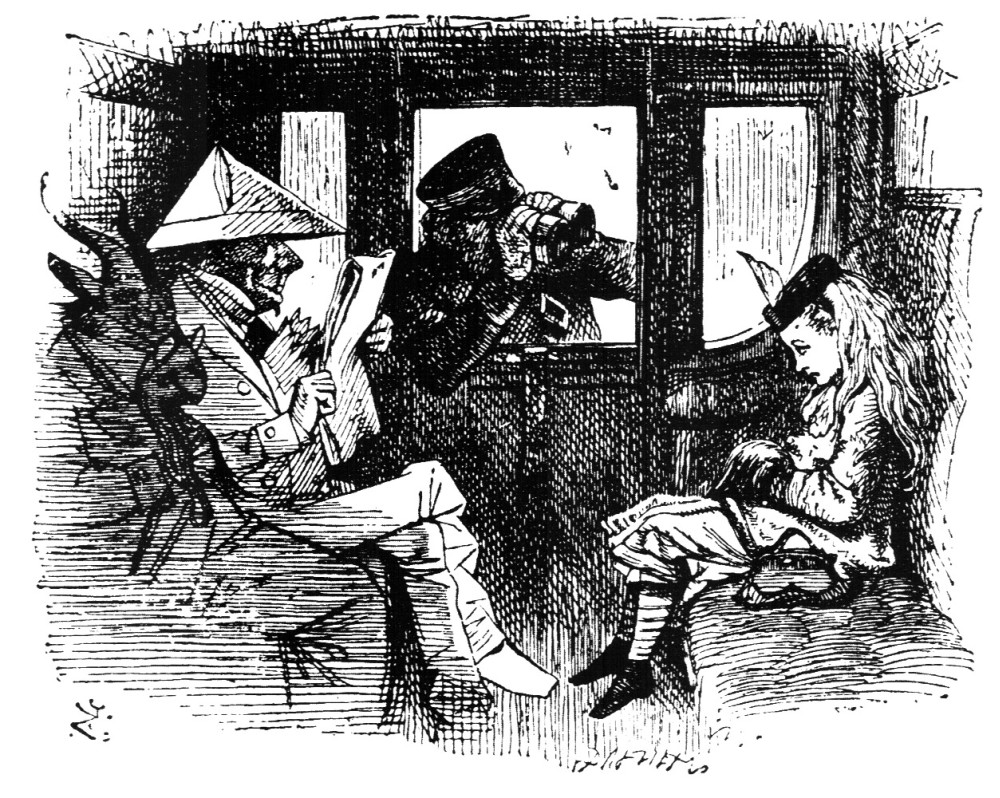
Train passengers and guard

While taking a train across the third square, Alice encounters several passengers, including a man dressed entirely in white paper, a goat, a horse with a cold, a beetle, and the Gnat (see below).

=== Guard ===
A guard on the train through the third square. He collects the passengers' giant tickets. He gets angry at Alice when she doesn't have one.

The guard was played in the 1985 TV movie by Merv Griffin.

=== Aged Man ===
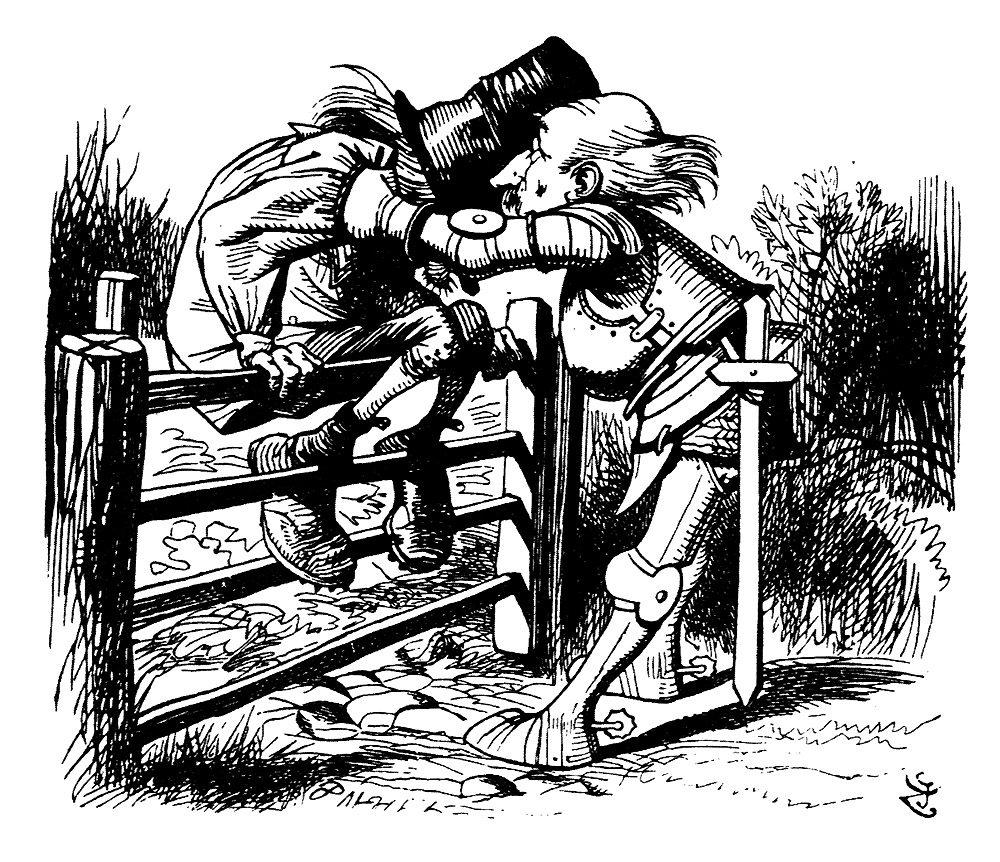
The Aged Man and the White Knight

He only appears within the poem "Haddocks' Eyes" that the White Knight recites to Alice in chapter VIII. According to the poem, the Knight met the Aged Man sitting atop a gate in a field and questioned him as to his profession. The Man responds with a long list of absurd occupations, including making waistcoat buttons from the eyes of haddocks and digging for buttered rolls.

The last stanza closes by describing him as:

...that old man I used to know—
Whose look was mild, whose speech was slow
Whose hair was whiter than the snow,
Whose face was very like a crow,
With eyes, like cinders, all aglow,
Who seemed distracted with his woe,
Who rocked his body to and fro,
And muttered mumblingly and low,
As if his mouth were full of dough...

The Aged Man represents the White King's bishop.

=== Lily ===
Lily is the daughter of the White Queen. The Queen is looking for her daughter Lily. Since she is too young to play, Alice takes her place as a pawn.

=== The Monstrous Crow ===
The Monstrous Crow is listed as the Red King's bishop, but Alice never encounters it over the course of the story. According to the rhyme, it is "black as a tar-barrel" and of a monstrous size. The Tweedle brothers (white rooks) are terrified of the Monstrous Crow, and when the pair see the White Queen's shawl being blown around by the wind at the end of chapter IV, they mistake it for the dread bird and flee through the woods because the shawl is black.

=== Bread-and-Butterfly ===
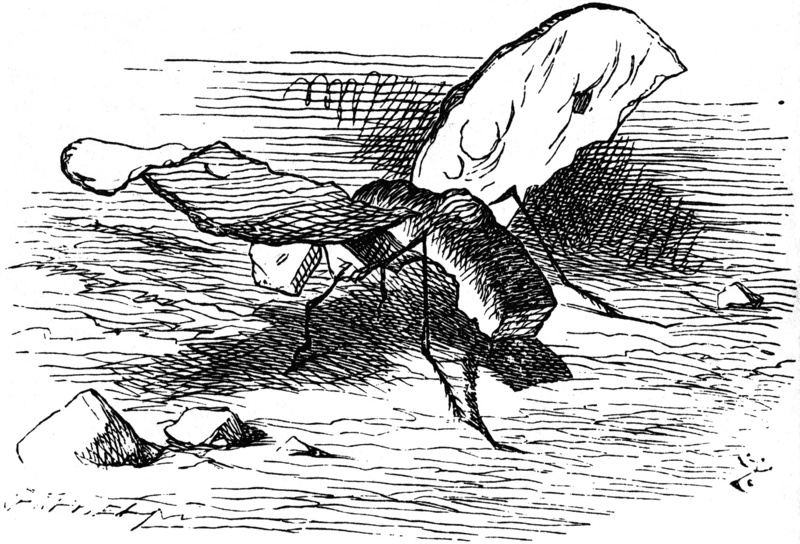
The Bread and Butterfly

The Bread-and-Butterfly is an insect from Through the Looking-Glass and What Alice Found There. Its name and form is a pun on bread and butter. Its wings are thin slices of bread-and-butter, with a crust as its body and a lump of sugar as its head. It lives on weak tea with cream in it.

In the 1951 Disney movie, it appears as a butterfly that has wings of bread with butter spread on them.

=== Rocking-Horsefly ===
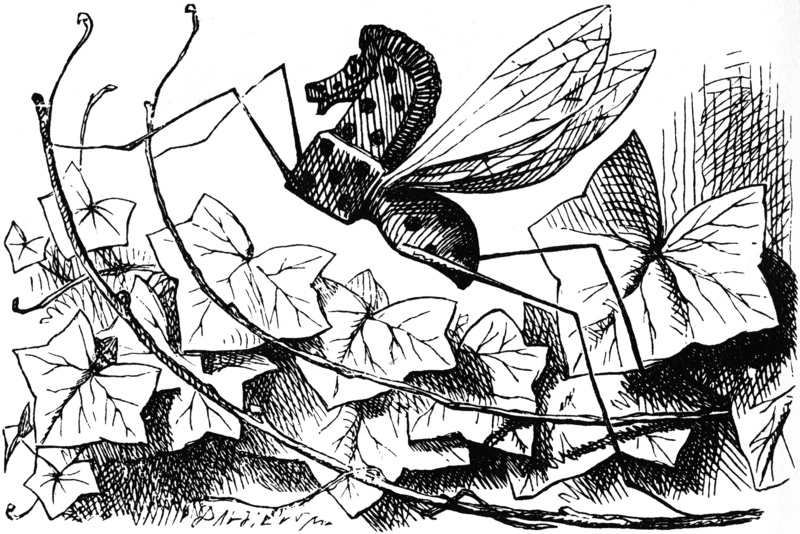
Rocking horsefly

The Rocking-Horsefly is an insect from Through the Looking-Glass and What Alice Found There. Its name and form is a pun on the rocking-horse. Its body is that of a horse with black dots and wings on its back, while its legs are connected to rockers. It is made entirely of wood and rocks about. It lives on sap and sawdust.

In the 1951 Disney movie its body is yellow, while its saddle, tail, and rockers are red.

In the 2010 adaptation, it has a black-and-white polka-dotted body. It has a mane and tail. A Rocking-Horse-Fly was seen defending itself against a Snap-Dragonfly; another was seen rocking on a mushroom in the mushroom garden.

In the manga Pandora Hearts, which is basically saturated with references to the books, there is a Chain that bears a resemblance to the Rocking-Horse Fly.

=== The Sheep ===
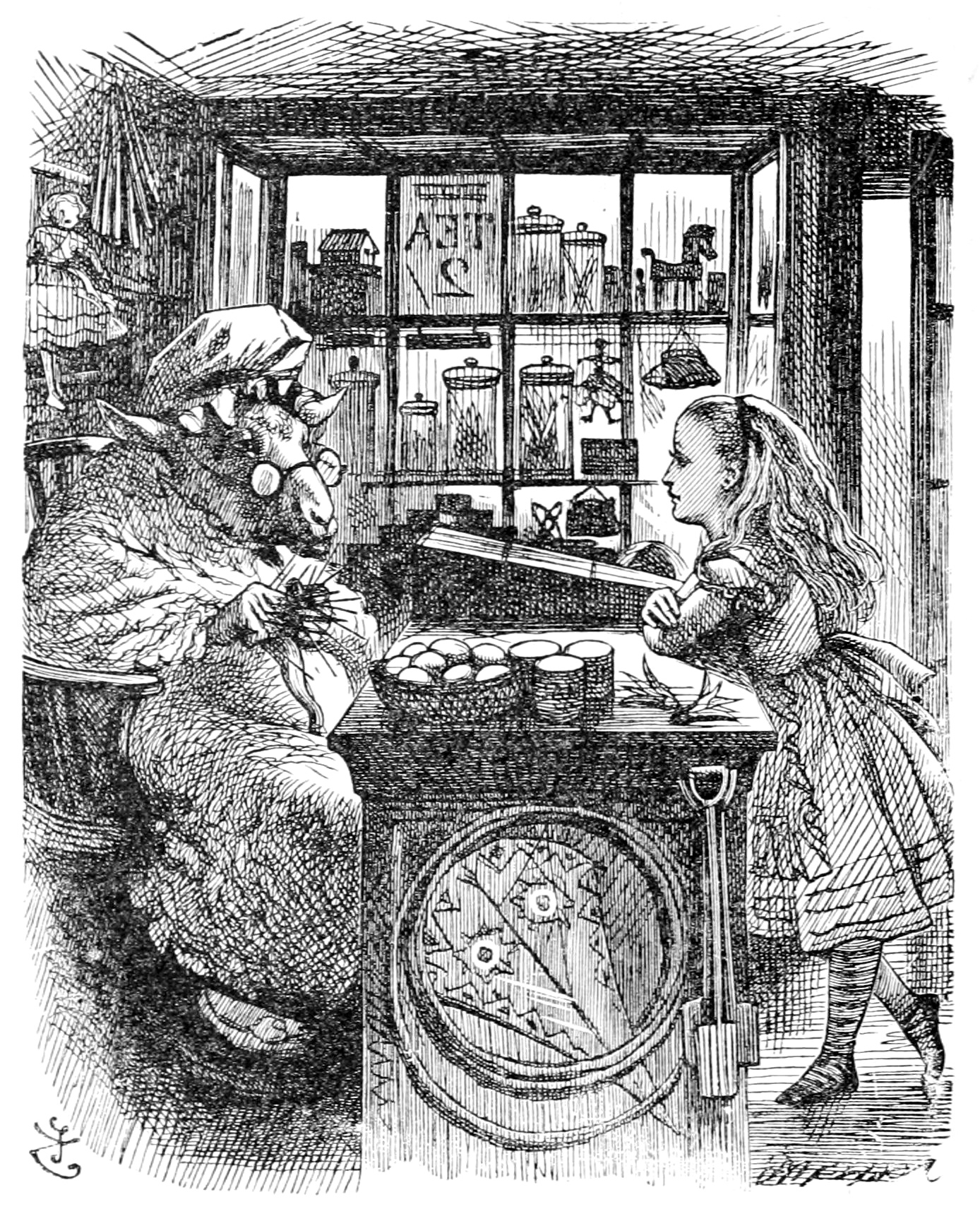

The Sheep is first mentioned in the fifth chapter of Through the Looking-Glass, "Wool and Water". The White Queen is talking to Alice, when she suddenly starts "baa-ing" and then seems to 'wrap herself in wool'. Alice figures out she is in a shop, and that The White Queen has turned into a sheep. The Sheep sits in her chair knitting as Alice looks around the shop. She gives Alice a pair of her knitting needles, and asks her if she can row. As Alice begins to answer, she realizes that they are in a little boat, and that the needles have turned into oars. As they glide along the water, the Sheep repeatedly shouts out "Feather", which means to lift the oar blades out of the water, turn them to a horizontal plane and swing them toward the bow so they don't get 'caught' in the water. The sheep then tells Alice that they will be catching 'crabs' (which is rowing terminology for getting one's blades stuck in the water if one fails to feather properly). Alice's attention is then put onto some scented rushes growing in the water. She tries picking them, but they are only 'dream rushes' and melt away. She then "catches a crab" and they are all suddenly in the shop again. Alice buys an egg from the Sheep (that ends up turning into Humpty Dumpty) and the two part ways.

=== Snap-Dragonfly ===
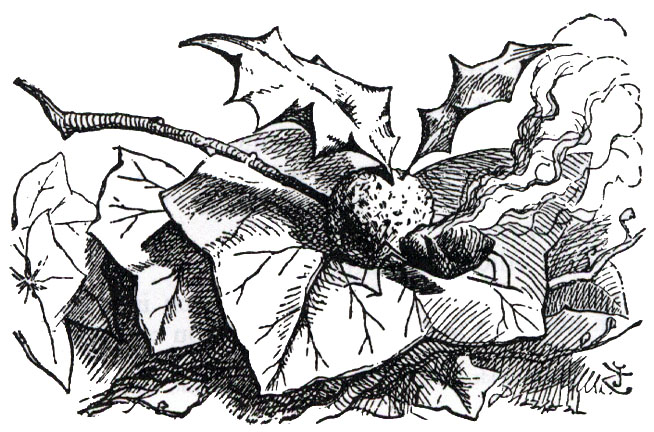
The Snap Dragonfly

The Snap-Dragonfly is an insect from Through the Looking-Glass and What Alice Found There. Its name and form is a pun on a traditional game called snap-dragon combined with a plant called a snapdragon and a dragonfly.

'Look on the branch above your head,' said the Gnat, 'and there you'll find a snap-dragon-fly. Its body is made of plum-pudding, its wings of holly-leaves, and its head is a raisin burning in brandy.'

'And what does it live on?'

'Frumenty and mince pie,' the Gnat replied; 'and it makes its nest in a Christmas box.'

— Lewis Carroll, Through the Looking-Glass and What Alice Found There

In the 2010 adaptation, the Snap-Dragonfly's body, head, and tail are those of a dragon with antennae resembling long and thin horns; therefore, its name and form is a pun on 'dragon' from dragonfly. Snap-Dragonflies are seen flying around, with one of them fighting a Rocking-Horse-Fly.

=== The Gnat ===
Alice meets the gnat on her head. He calls Alice an old friend, but Alice doesn't recognize him—causing him to become depressed. During the train ride, Alice hears the Gnat mentioning topics he believes would make good jokes. The Gnat seems to love jokes; however, he doesn't like telling them himself—he prefers others to tell the jokes. After the journey on the train, the Gnat introduces her to three insects: the Rocking-Horse-Fly, the Snap-Dragonfly, and the Bread-and-Butterfly. He then sighs himself away.

Actors who have played the gnat on screen include George Gobel and Steve Coogan. Though he doesn't make an appearance in the 1999 film, he was mentioned in the second verse of 'Twinkle, Twinkle, Little Bat,' when the Mad Hatter was recognized by the Queen of Hearts.

=== The Fawn ===
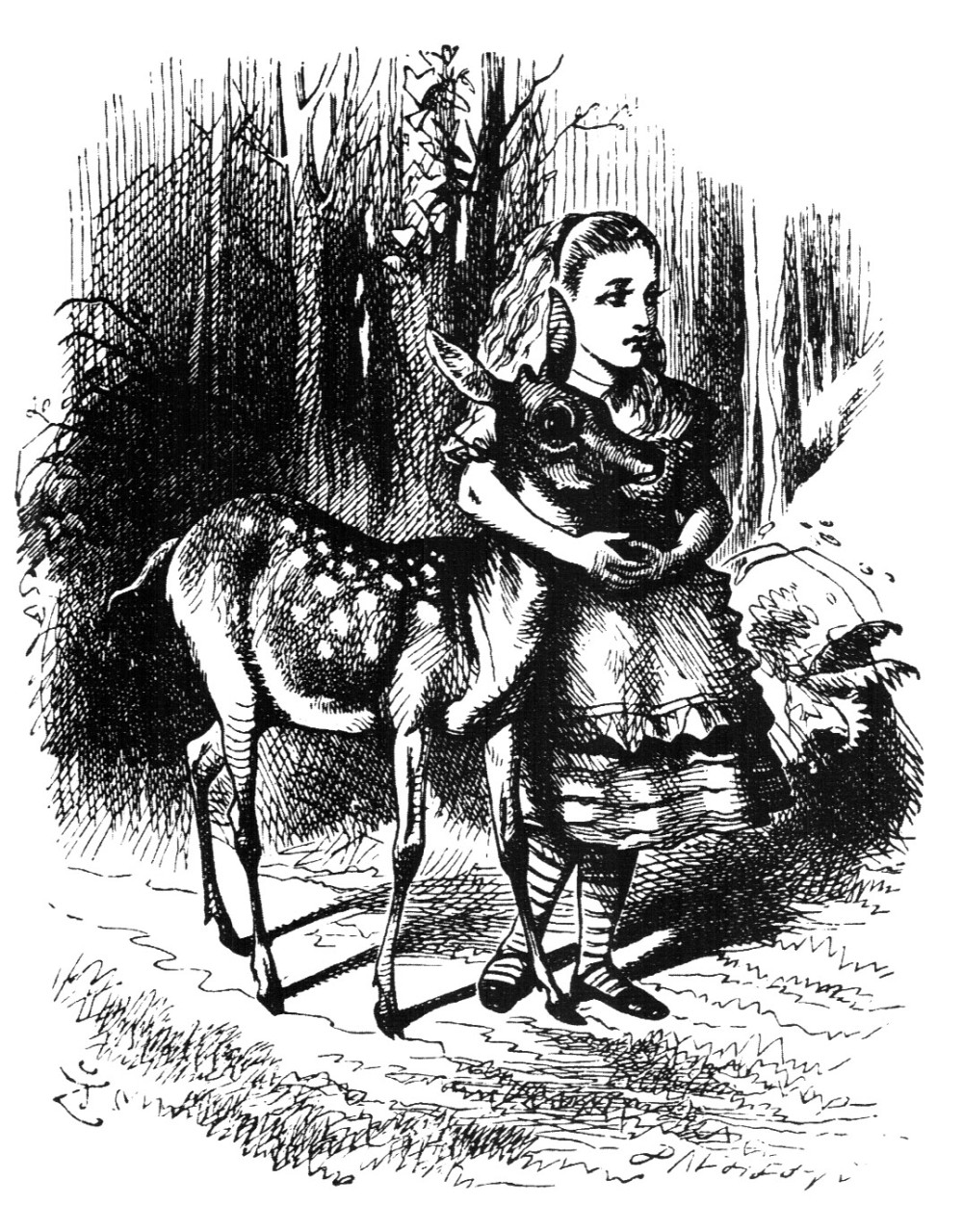
Alice and the fawn

Alice meets the fawn in Chapter 3 after getting off the train, and coming to an open field. No longer being able to remember her name, she sees the fawn. They have both forgotten their names, and decide to walk together as they ponder them. The fawn then remembers its name, and realizes Alice is a human, instinctively running away. Alice cries after it, but is glad that he helped her to remember her own name.

In the 1985 film, Alice meets it after meeting the Mad Hatter, the March Hare, and the Dormouse. The fawn doesn't speak, but it sucks on Alice's fingers while she pets it. Alice sings a song to it, and then it leaves to find its mother while Alice leaves to try and get back home.

== Characters created for films ==
- The Doorknob (voiced by Joseph Kearns) is a character created for the 1951 Disney Film. It likes to sleep, and therefore prefers silence over noise. The Doorknob also appears in House of Mouse voiced by Corey Burton. As shown in Kingdom Hearts video game, The Doorknob also hides the world's Keyhole and is reprised by Corey Burton. The Doorknob is the only character from the 1951 film not to have appeared in the book itself. It also uses the phrase "One good turn deserves another", an idiom first recorded at the end of the 14th century. Contrary to the entry in Jiminy's Journal, Sora and company never enter through the door on which the Doorknob is fixed. The Doorknob appears again in Kingdom Hearts 358/2 Days, this time having a conversation with Roxas.
- The Owl appears in the second segment of the 1985 movie version, first as a painting, then at other points as a character who gives Alice advice about courage. He is played by Jack Warden.

In the 2010 Tim Burton film several characters were created. These include:

- Bayard the Bloodhound (voiced by Timothy Spall) – An older version of the Puppy from chapter IV of Alice's Adventures in Wonderland. The film also includes his wife and puppies.
- The Ascots – A family whose son Hamish (Leo Bill) wishes to marry Alice. Lord and Lady Ascot are played by Tim Pigott-Smith and Geraldine James, respectively.
- Charles Kingsleigh was Alice's beloved father who later passes away in the second film. Charles is played by the New Zealand actor Marton Csokas. His wife is played by Lindsay Duncan.
