= Desmond Barrit =

British actor (1944–2026)

- Born: Desmond Brown; 19 October 1944; Swansea, Wales
- Died: 21 March 2026 (aged 81); Islington, London, England
- Occupation: Actor
- Years active: 1979–2021

Desmond Morgan Barrit (born Desmond Brown; 19 October 1944 – 21 March 2026) was a British actor, best known for his stage work.

== Life and career ==
Desmond Brown was born in Morriston, near Swansea in the historic county of Glamorgan on 19 October 1944. His start as a professional actor was late, having spent early adulthood working as an accountant and in amateur theatre. When he acquired an Equity card in the mid-1970s, he had to change his name, since Desmond Brown was already taken. An early screen role for Barrit came in Alice through the Looking Glass (1998), in which he played Humpty Dumpty.

In 2003, he played Shylock in the Chichester Festival Theatre's production of Shakespeare's The Merchant of Venice, while in 2007, he appeared in The History Boys at Wyndham's Theatre portraying the general studies teacher, Hector, made famous by Richard Griffiths in the film version.

In 2004, in a limited-run revival of A Funny Thing Happened on the Way to the Forum at the Royal National Theatre Barrit played Pseudolus opposite Philip Quast as Miles Gloriosus, Hamish McColl as Hysterium and Isla Blair as Domina (who had previously played Philia in the 1963 production). The production was nominated for the 2005 Olivier Award, Outstanding Musical Production.

In January 2007, he played Raymond Clandillon in Midsomer Murders (series 10; episode 7: "They Seek Him Here"). On 7 July 2008, he took over the role of The Wizard from Nigel Planer in the West End production of Wicked at the Apollo Victoria Theatre. Originally set to begin 9 June, his performance had to be postponed as he had to undergo an operation.

Beginning 12 December 2011, he returned to Wicked, reprising his role of the Wizard, taking over from Clive Carter. He ended his third return engagement with the show on 7 July 2012 (four years after his debut), and was replaced three weeks later by Keith Bartlett.

In 2014, he appeared as Michaud in Helen Edmundson's adaptation of Therese Raquin at the Theatre Royal, Bath.

== Death ==
Barrit died at his home in Islington, London, on 21 March 2026, at the age of 81.

== Filmography ==
=== Film ===
Year	Film	Role	Notes
1984	Lassiter	Cop 1	
1992	Rebecca's Daughters	Jack Wet	
1992	Homer and His Pigeons	Des	
1996	A Midsummer Night's Dream	Nick Bottom	
1997	Daylight Robbery	Kesso	Short film
1998	St. Ives	Biggerstaff	

=== Television ===
Year	Film	Role	Notes
1979	Follow the Star	Shepherd	Television film
1987	Valentine Park	Vicar	Episode: #1.1
1989	Great Expectations	Jagger's Client	Mini-series; episode 2
1989	Somewhere to Run	Bus Conductor	Television film
1990	A Kind of Living	Vicar	Episode: #3.1
1991	The Bill	Dando	Episode: "Jobs for the Boys"
1991	Agatha Christie's Poirot	Samuel Naughton	Episode: "The Tragedy at Marsdon Manor"
1991	The Lisa Maxwell Show	Guest	Episode: #1.2
1992	The Old Devils	Tarquin Jones	Mini-series; episodes 1–3
1992	Boon	Father McShane	Episode: "Away from It All"
1995	Pirates	Bogus Malarky	Episode: "Gran's Back!"
1996	Dalziel and Pascoe	Henry Saltcombe	Episode: "An Advancement of Learning"
1997	True Tilda	Mr. Mortimer	Unknown episodes
1998	Alice Through the Looking Glass	Humpty Dumpty	Television film
1998	The Bill	Mr. Pierson	Episode: "S.A.D."
1999	Oliver Twist	Flinders	Mini-series; episode 2
1999	A Christmas Carol	Ghost of Christmas Present	Television film
2000	Madame Bovary	Guillaumin	2-part television film
2002	Midsomer Murders	Jonathan Eckersley-Hyde	Episode: "Murder on St. Malley's Day"
2002	Young Arthur	Bullwhit	Television films
2007	Northanger Abbey	Mr. Allen	Television films
2007	Midsomer Murders	Raymond Clandillon	Episode: "They Seek Him Here"
2008	Zip and Hollow	Harry	Television films
2009	The Fairy Queen	Basses / Bottom	Television films
2014	Endeavour	Stephen Fitzowen	Episode: "Nocturne"
2015	Holby City	'Aubrey' Alan Bacon	Episode: "Bad Blood, Fake Snow"
2021	It's a Sin	Timothy Mottram	Mini-series; episode 4
