= Looking-Glass world =

Setting of Through the Looking-Glass

- Through the Looking-Glass location
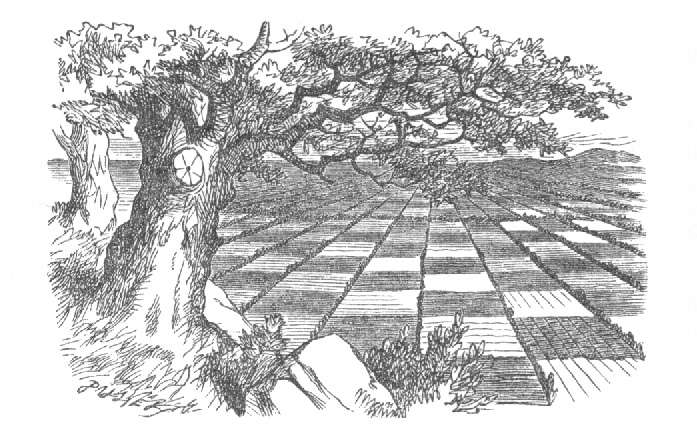
- The Looking-Glass world as illustrated by John Tenniel (1872 edition)

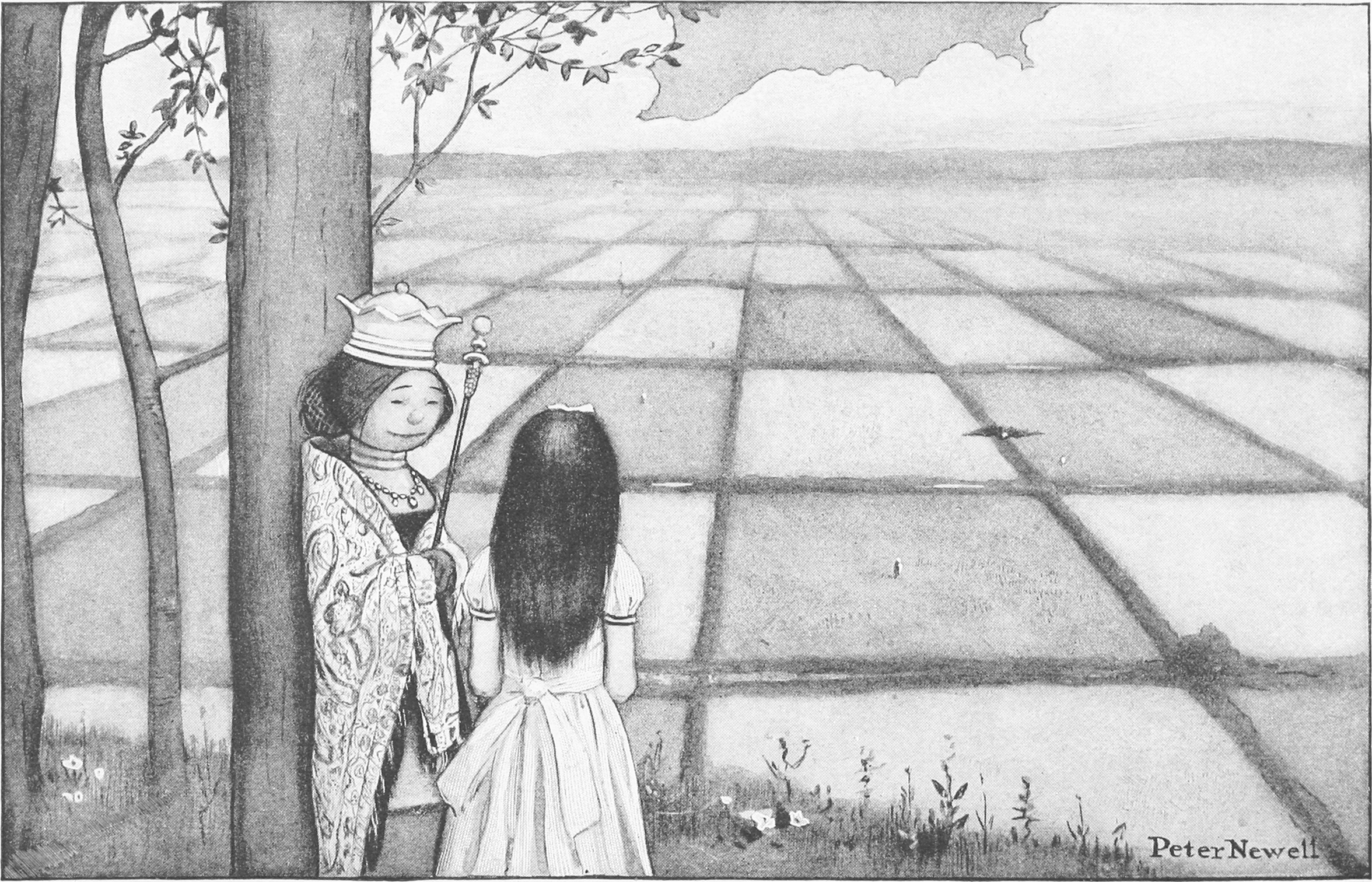
- The Looking-Glass world as illustrated by Peter Newell (1902 edition)
- Created by: Lewis Carroll
- Genre: Children's fantasy

In-universe information
- Type: Monarchy
- Ruled by: White King, Red King
- Ethnic groups: Whites, Reds
- Locations: Looking-Glass House, Garden of Live Flowers, The Old Sheep Shop, Humpty Dumpty's wall
- Characters: White Knight, Tweedledum and Tweedledee, Humpty Dumpty, White Queen, Red Queen
- Language(s): Looking-Glass language (mirror-image English)

The Looking-Glass world is the setting for Lewis Carroll's 1871 children's novel Through the Looking-Glass.

== Geography ==
... and a most curious country it was.

The entire country is divided into squares by a series of little brooks with hedges growing perpendicular to them.

== Government ==
The land is contested by two competing factions, the Reds and the Whites. Each side has its King and Queen, bishops, knights, armies, and castles.

== Inhabitants ==
- Haigha
- Hatta
- Humpty Dumpty
- The Lion and the Unicorn
- Red King
- Red Queen
- The Sheep
- Tweedledum and Tweedledee
- White King
- White Knight
- White Queen

== In other media ==
- The Looking-glass world is featured in Once Upon a Time in Wonderland. In this series, the world is known as Wonderland and the Looking-glass world is just a realm within Wonderland, ruled by the Red King and Queen.

== See also ==
- Wonderland (fictional country)
