= White Queen (Through the Looking-Glass) =

Fictional character from Carroll's Through the Looking-Glass

- Alice character
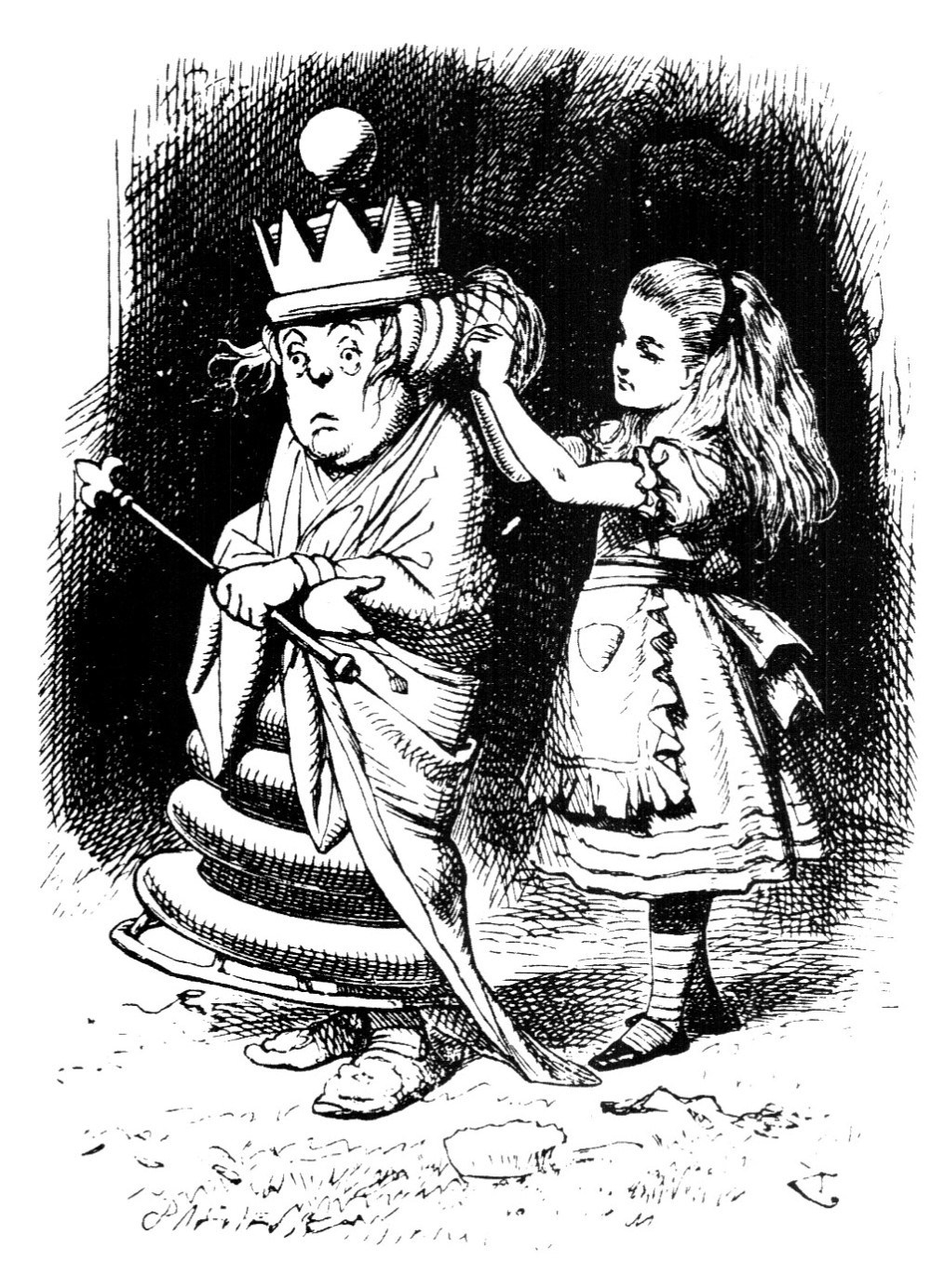
- Alice and the White Queen; Art by John Tenniel (1865)
- First appearance: Through the Looking-Glass
- Created by: Lewis Carroll
- Portrayed by: Anne Hathaway (Alice in Wonderland, Alice Through the Looking Glass); Emma Rigby (Once Upon a Time in Wonderland); Carol Channing (Alice in Wonderland)

In-universe information
- Species: Human
- Gender: Female
- Occupation: Queen
- Spouse: White King
- Children: Lily (a pawn)
- Nationality: Looking-glass world

The White Queen is a fictional character who appears in Lewis Carroll's 1871 fantasy novel Through the Looking-Glass.

== Plot ==
Along with her husband the White King, she is one of the first characters to be seen in the story. She first appears in the drawing room just beyond the titular looking-glass as an animate chesspiece unable to see or hear Alice, the main character. The Queen is looking for her daughter Lily; Alice helps her by lifting the White Queen and King onto the table, leading them to believe they were thrown up by an invisible volcano.

When Alice meets the Red Queen and joins the chess game, she takes the place of a white pawn, Lily being too young to play. She does not meet the White Queen as a human-sized character until the Fifth Square. The White Queen lives backwards in time, due to the fact that she lives through the eponymous looking glass. Her behaviour is odd to Alice. She offers Alice "jam to-morrow and jam yesterday - but never jam to-day." She screams in pain until, rather than because, she pricks her thumb on her brooch, and tells Alice of the King's messenger who has been imprisoned for a crime he will later be tried for and perhaps (but not definitely) commit in the end. The White Queen, aside from telling Alice things that she finds difficult to believe (one being that she is just over 101 years old) says that in her youth she could believe "six impossible things before breakfast" and counsels Alice to practice the same skill. The meeting ends with the Queen seeming to turn into a bespectacled sheep who sits at a counter in a shop as Alice passes into the next square on the board. The Sheep is somewhat different from the Queen in terms of personality and gets "more like a porcupine every time [Alice] looks at her" because she knits with several knitting needles all at once. Two of these needles turn into oars when Alice appears in a boat, and then reappear in the Sheep's shop, where Alice purchases an egg, which becomes Humpty Dumpty as she moves to the next square.

In Chapter 9, the White Queen appears with the Red Queen, posing a series of typical Wonderland/Looking-Glass questions ("Divide a loaf by a knife: what's the answer to that?"), and then celebrating Alice's promotion from pawn to queen. When that celebration goes awry, the White Queen seems to flee the scene by disappearing into a tureen of soup. Martin Gardner's The Annotated Alice points out that the White King is at the time in check from the Red Queen. Alice proceeds to "capture" the Red Queen and checkmate the Red King, ending the game. The White Queen is not seen again, except as one of Alice's white cats, who Alice speculates may have influenced the dream.

== In other media ==
=== Tim Burton's films ===
Mirana, the White Queen
- Alice in Wonderland character
- Anne Hathaway as the White Queen in Tim Burton's 2010 adaptation
- First appearance: Alice in Wonderland (2010)
- Created by: Lewis Carroll; Tim Burton
- Portrayed by: Anne Hathaway (adult); Amelia Crouch (child)

In-universe information
- Full name: Mirana of Marmoreal
- Occupation: Queen of Wonderland
- Family: King Oleron (father); Queen Elsemere (mother); Queen Iracebeth (sister)

==== Alice in Wonderland (2010) ====
Anne Hathaway portrays the White Queen (renamed "Mirana of Marmoreal") in Tim Burton's 2010 adaptation alongside Helena Bonham Carter as Iracebeth, the Red Queen; they are portrayed as sisters. The White Queen's soldiers appear in white armor inspired by chess pieces while The Red Queen's appear in armour made to resemble cards. Mirana's delicate exterior is reinforced by her habit of holding her hands gracefully at shoulder height in almost every scene in which she appears. But her black fingernail polish and the dark circles under her eyes, as well as her nonchalance about certain potion ingredients ("buttered fingers"), hint at a more complex character under the surface. Additionally, she is portrayed as a beautiful young woman with white blonde hair, a flawless complexion and air of elegance, grace and perfection.

In the movie, Iracebeth has banished her sister from "Underland" out of jealousy; Mirana, having taken a vow never to harm another living thing, is helpless to fight back and must wait years for the "Frabjous Day," when a "champion" will arrive and slay the Jabberwocky, Iracebeth's fearsome pet. That champion arrives in Alice (Mia Wasikowska), now a young woman, who initially thinks she is having a recurring dream. By the film's climax, Alice accepts her destiny and slays the Jabberwocky, restoring rulership of Wonderland to the White Queen. Mirana banishes her sister and bids Alice goodbye. After Alice remarks that Mirana cannot imagine the horror that goes on inside the Red Queen's castle, Mirana - while holding a knife - coldly replies, "Oh yes, I can." Mirana apparently is not above cruel punishment such as having her sister exiled to the Outlands for the rest of her days where nobody is to show her kindness or say a word to her. Mirana also had the Knave of Hearts unwillingly kept in Iracebeth's company for the rest of his life.

==== Alice Through The Looking Glass (2016) ====
While the first film borrows elements from both of Lewis Carroll's novels, the sequel introduces characters not featured in those novels. The story is entirely different to Carroll's novel and centers on the origin of Mad Hatter and the feud between Mirana and Iracebeth. At the end of the film, the sisters make amends.

=== Other adaptations ===
- In Sandra the Fairytale Detective, her name is Victoria because she is the Queen of Victory.
- The character of Genevieve Heart in Frank Beddor's The Looking Glass Wars series is considered a re-imagining of the White Queen.
- The main antagonist of the manga and anime series Pandora Hearts, known as the Will of the Abyss, is based on the White Queen in appearance and mannerisms, and is also identical to another character named Alice, who is based on the Red Queen. It's soon revealed that Alice is her twin sister and her name is also Alice but it's Jack who is the true antagonist and she is the vessel of the Core of the Abyss.
- The character of Mrs Wragge in Wilkie Collins' No Name (pub 1864) is considered to be a model for the White Queen.
- In Adventures in Wonderland, the character of the Duchess, played by Teri Garr, combines aspects of the character of the same name from Alice's Adventures in Wonderland and the White Queen, just as her friend and rival, the Red Queen, does with the Queen of Hearts.
- In the series finale of Once Upon a Time in Wonderland, Alice mentions that the Red Queen (who had redeemed herself over the course of the series) was now known as the White Queen.
- In Ever After High, the White Queen (voiced by Stephanie Sheh) is the co-ruler of Wonderland alongside the Queen of Hearts. Since Wonderland has become uninhabitable due to the Evil Queen's actions, the White Queen has fled her realm and taken up a role as teacher at Ever After High replacing Ms. Gold. She teaches Princessology and Kingdom Management. The White Queen is not a kind teacher though, having no qualms about publicly humiliating her students and insisting she is addressed by her full title "Mrs. Her Majesty The White Queen".
