= White King (Through the Looking-Glass) =

- Alice character
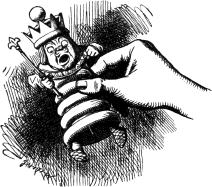
- 1871 illustration by John Tenniel
- First appearance: Through the Looking-Glass
- Created by: Lewis Carroll
- Portrayed by: Michael Socha (Once Upon a Time in Wonderland)

In-universe information
- Species: Human
- Gender: Male
- Occupation: King
- Spouse: White Queen
- Children: Lily (a pawn)
- Nationality: Looking-glass world

The White King is a fictional character who appears in Lewis Carroll's 1871 fantasy novel Through the Looking-Glass. Aside from Alice herself, he is one of the earliest chesspieces that are introduced into the story. Although he does not interact with Alice as much as the White Queen does, because Alice becomes a pawn on his side of the Chess-game, he is, on some levels, the most important character within the story at least as far as the game is concerned. He is not to be confused with the King of Hearts from Alice's Adventures in Wonderland.

== Role in Through the Looking-Glass ==
=== Prior to the game ===
When Alice first sees the White King, having passed through the eponymous looking glass, he is a chesspiece of normal size, but animate, and, for whatever reason, cannot hear or see Alice at this stage. Alice, not realising this, picks both him and the White Queen off the floor and places them on a table, leading them to believe that some unseen volcano blew them up there. Afterwards, however, she has some mischievous fun by manipulating the King's handwriting from behind while he writes so that he comes out with nonsense in his memorandum book ("the White Knight is sliding down the poker. He balances very badly"). She soon leaves him alone, however, when she sees the poetry-book in which "Jabberwocky" is written.

=== During the game ===
When Alice sees the White King next, in a later chapter, he is, along with many other characters in the story, the size of a normal adult. Humpty Dumpty, as a chesspiece, is "taken" (symbolised by his notorious fall from where he sits) and the White King appears with his soldiers, presumably in hopes of putting him back together. He and Alice begin characteristic Wonderland/Looking-Glass banter, as well as the usual Carrollian word play ("I only wish I had such eyes...to be able to see Nobody"). His imperial status as a king, as well as his tendency to take things literally, is reflected in such statements as "it isn't respectable to beg" when Alice simply says "I beg your pardon" and he also remarks that he needs his two messengers Hatta and Haigha: "one to come and one to go... one to fetch and one to carry". When Haigha arrives he claims, in all seriousness, that there is "nothing like eating hay when you're feeling faint", and having eaten two ham sandwiches consumes some hay just as casually. He expresses mixed feelings about two other characters, the Lion and the Unicorn: amusement at the fact that they are "fighting for the crown" even though it is his own crown they are fighting over, but at the same time nervousness when the "two great creatures" stand on either side of him. However, given that they, as chesspieces, are protecting him from danger from the red side, there is, as Carroll tells us, "nothing to be done about it".

His identity as a king in a game of Chess is revealed all the more when he admits that he can never quite catch up with his spouse, because, like all chess-queens, she moves too fast and for too many squares ahead of him for him to overtake her. Indeed, a more extreme version of this relationship can be seen on the opposite side of the game, in which the Red King remains asleep throughout the whole story, and the Red Queen runs her famous race.

=== Late in the game ===
Although we do not see the White King again, he is placed into check by the Red Knight before the clumsy soldier is defeated by the even-clumsier White Knight. Gardner, in The Annotated Alice has observed that he is also later put into check by the Red Queen, without either side showing any acknowledgment of it. The White Queen, with characteristic stupidity, performs a completely pointless move on her turn. After Alice "takes" the Red Queen and checkmates the inanimate Red King, any potential danger is removed and the game, as well as her dream, comes to an end.

== In other media ==
- In the anime and manga series Pandora Hearts, the White King seems to have the core of the abyss, with Levi also having some elements.
- The White King appears in the 1985 made-for-TV adaptation of Alice in Wonderland and is portrayed by Harvey Korman. He and one of his messengers, played by John Stamos, sing to Alice the story of The Lion and the Unicorn.
- The White King appears in the video game American McGee's Alice and its sequel, Alice: Madness Returns.
- In the final moments of television series Once Upon a Time in Wonderland, Alice says that the Knave married the Red Queen, the two then becoming the White King and Queen.
