= Red King (Through the Looking-Glass) =

- Alice character
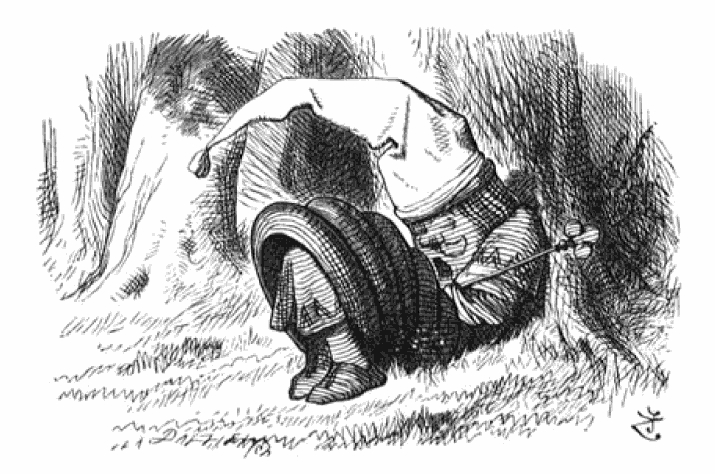
- Red King snoring, by John Tenniel
- First appearance: Through the Looking-Glass
- Created by: Lewis Carroll

In-universe information
- Species: Human
- Gender: Male
- Occupation: King
- Spouse: Red Queen
- Nationality: Looking-glass world

The Red King is a character who appears in Lewis Carroll's 1871 fantasy novel Through the Looking-Glass.

== History ==
Since the whole story revolves around a game of chess, he is characteristic of the king in such a game in that he has all of the pieces on his side available to perform the work for him; unlike his white counterpart, though, he does not move at all throughout the story. Indeed, when Alice first meets him he is fast asleep ("fit to snore his head off", as Tweedledum says) and Alice, even prior to seeing him, mistakes the sound he is making for "lions or tigers". During this time, Tweedledum and Tweedledee state that she is part of the Red King's dream and she will "go out—bang!—like a candle" when he wakes.

The match ends by Alice's checkmating of the king, an action coincident with the taking of the Red Queen. In the final chapter of the book, Alice acknowledges that the Red King had, after all, been asleep throughout the whole game, and is left wondering whether the whole experience was her dream or his.

Due to his inactivity, some authors, such as Martin Gardner in The Annotated Alice, have speculated that if Carroll intended to portray the red side of the chess-game as being representative of the negative sides of human nature, then the vice he had in mind for the Red King was idleness.

Others have speculated that the whole experience in the book was both Alice's and the Red King's. As when Alice awoke, the Looking-Glass world would have disappeared, so too would she have disappeared from the Looking-Glass world when the Red King may have woken up after being checkmated by Alice, just as the Tweedles had described earlier in the book.

== In other media ==
- In the 1999 film the king is seen sleeping in the forest as he does in the book. It is also revealed that the Red King is the King of Hearts's brother.
- In the 2010 Alice in Wonderland film, the Red King was revealed to have been decapitated by the Red Queen out of the fear that he would have left her for the White Queen if she had not had him executed. His head is seen floating in the Queen's moat of heads.
- In the TV series Once Upon a Time in Wonderland, the Red King (Garwin Sanford) is a ruler of Wonderland, at odds with the Queen of Hearts (Barbara Hershey), who takes an interest in Anastasia, the lover of Will Scarlet. Anastasia betrays Will to marry the Red King, thus becoming the Red Queen.
- The manga Pandora Hearts has Glen Baskerville, originally Oswald, being inspired by the Red King with his sister Lacie being based on the Red Queen.
- The character appears as a boss in American McGee's Alice, as the ruler of the Red Kingdom. He is first seen leading an assault on the White Kingdom, which leads to the capture and execution of the White Queen. To reach the passage to the realm of The Queen of Hearts, Alice must defeat the Red King, and transport one of the White Pawns to his chess board, allowing it to become a new White Queen.
- In the video game What Remains of Edith Finch, a book titled The Red King's Dream shows up in Lewis room. Lewis is a character lost in his imagination. The player has to play the Lewis in his imaginary world and the Lewis in the reality world simultaneously. The common ground shared by Lewis and the Red King is: if the one character/self exists in the other's dream/imagination, does the one character/self still exist when the other wakes up?
- Alan Moore's Miracleman book "The Red King Syndrome" takes its name from this story. In this comic, three supermen created in a laboratory are kept in a state of "hibernation" by the scientist who created them, because he fears their powers. As he monitors their dreams, he discovers that the device that controls them has ceased to have an effect and that the supermen are now unconsciously creating scenarios that reveal to them that they are experiencing a dream. Upon realizing this, the scientist explains what is happening to his laboratory co-leader using the Red King as a metaphor.
