= Tweedledum and Tweedledee =

Pair of fictional brothers from Carroll's "Through the Looking Glass"

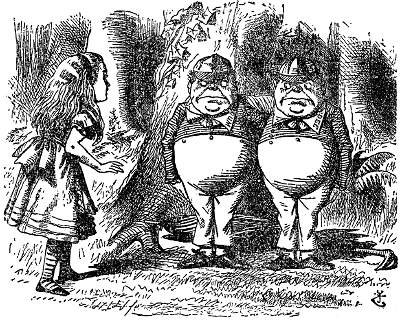
- John Tenniel's illustration, from Through the Looking-Glass (1871), chapter 4

Nursery rhyme
- Published: 1805

Tweedledum and Tweedledee are characters in an English nursery rhyme and in Lewis Carroll's 1871 book Through the Looking-Glass, and What Alice Found There. Their names may have originally come from an epigram written by poet John Byrom. The nursery rhyme has a Roud Folk Song Index number of 19800. The names have since become synonymous in western popular culture slang for any two people whose appearances and actions are identical.

== Lyrics ==
Common versions of the nursery rhyme include:

Tweedledum and Tweedledee
Agreed to have a battle;
For Tweedledum said Tweedledee
Had spoiled his nice new rattle.

Just then flew down a monstrous crow,
As black as a tar-barrel;
Which frightened both the heroes so,
They quite forgot their quarrel.

== Origins ==
The words "Tweedle-dee and Tweedle-dum" make their first appearance in print as names applied to the composers George Frideric Handel and Giovanni Bononcini in "one of the most celebrated and most frequently quoted (and sometimes misquoted) epigrams", satirising disagreements between Handel and Bononcini, written by John Byrom (1692–1763): in his satire, from 1725.

Some say, compar'd to Bononcini
That Mynheer Handel's but a Ninny
Others aver, that he to Handel
Is scarcely fit to hold a Candle
Strange all this Difference should be
'Twixt Tweedle-dum and Tweedle-dee!

Although Byrom is clearly the author of the epigram, the last two lines have also been attributed to Jonathan Swift and Alexander Pope. While the familiar form of the rhyme was first printed in Original Ditties for the Nursery (c. 1805), Byrom may have drawn on an existing rhyme.

== Through The Looking-Glass ==
The characters are perhaps best known from Lewis Carroll's Through the Looking-Glass and what Alice Found There (1871). Carroll, having introduced two fat little men named Tweedledee and Tweedledum, quotes the nursery rhyme, which the two brothers then go on to enact. They agree to have a battle, but never have one. When they see a monstrous black crow swooping down, they take to their heels. The Tweedle brothers never contradict each other, even when one of them, according to the rhyme, "agrees to have a battle". Rather, they complement each other's words, which led John Tenniel to portray them as twins in his illustrations for the book.

== Other depictions ==
- Tweedledee and Tweedledum appear in Disney's 1951 version of Alice in Wonderland, both voiced by J. Pat O'Malley, and representing the sun and moon as they tell Alice the story of The Walrus and the Carpenter, and the first stanza of the poem called, You Are Old, Father William before Alice quietly leaves to find the White Rabbit. They were seen again at the end of the film during the chase. The Disney versions of the characters later appeared in the Disney television series House of Mouse and one of them in the final scene of Who Framed Roger Rabbit.
- Tweedledee and Tweedledum appear in Once Upon a Time in Wonderland, portrayed by Ben Cotton and Matty Finochio. They appear as the Red Queen's servants where they started out working for the Red King. While Tweedledum is shown to be loyal to the Red Queen, Tweedledee is shown to be loyal to Jafar.
