= Red Queen (Through the Looking-Glass) =

- Alice character
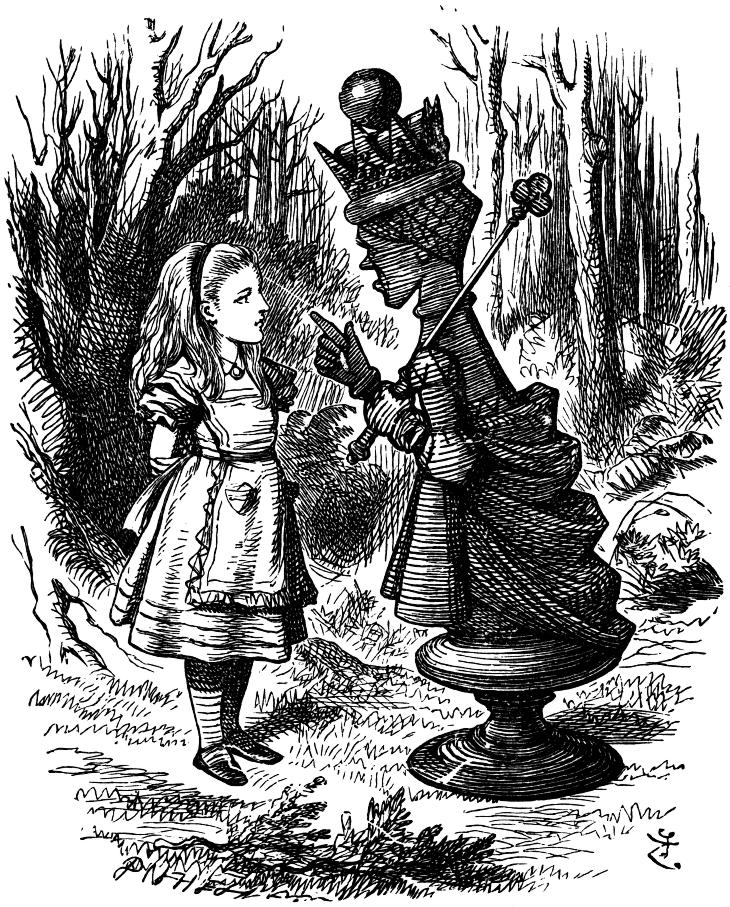
- The Red Queen lecturing Alice; Art by John Tenniel
- First appearance: Through the Looking-Glass
- Created by: Lewis Carroll
- Portrayed by: Helena Bonham Carter (2010 / 2016); Leilah de Meza (Young; 2016)

In-universe information
- Gender: Female
- Occupation: Queen
- Spouse: Red King
- Nationality: Looking-glass world

The Red Queen is a fictional character and the main antagonist in Lewis Carroll's fantasy 1871 novel Through the Looking-Glass. She is often confused with the Queen of Hearts from the previous book Alice's Adventures in Wonderland (1865), although the two are very different.

== Overview ==
With a motif of Through the Looking-Glass being a representation of the game of chess, the Red Queen could be viewed as an antagonist in the story as she is the queen for the side opposing Alice. Despite this, their initial encounter is a cordial one, with the Red Queen explaining the rules of chess concerning promotion—specifically that Alice is able to become a queen by starting out as a pawn and reaching the eighth square at the opposite end of the board. As a queen in the game of chess, the Red Queen is able to move swiftly and effortlessly.

Later, in Chapter 9, the Red Queen appears with the White Queen, posing a series of typical Wonderland/Looking-Glass questions ("Divide a loaf by a knife: what's the answer to that?"), and then celebrating Alice's promotion from pawn to queen. When that celebration goes awry, Alice turns against the Red Queen, whom she "considers as the cause of all the mischief", and shakes her until the queen changes into Alice's pet kitten. In doing this, Alice presents an end game, awakening from the dream world of the looking glass, by both realizing her hallucination and symbolically "taking" the Red Queen in order to checkmate the Red King. The red queen is often said to be based on Mary Prickett, Alice Liddell's family's governess.

== Confusion with the Queen of Hearts ==
The Red Queen is commonly mistaken for the Queen of Hearts from the story's predecessor, Alice's Adventures in Wonderland. The two share the characteristics of being strict queens associated with the color red, while their personalities are very different. Carroll, in his lifetime, made the distinction between the two Queens by saying:

I pictured to myself the Queen of Hearts as a sort of embodiment of ungovernable passion – a blind and aimless Fury.
The Red Queen I pictured as a Fury, but of another type; her passion must be cold and calm – she must be formal and strict, yet not unkindly; pedantic to the 10th degree, the concentrated essence of all governesses!

— Lewis Carroll in "Alice on the Stage"

The 1951 Walt Disney animated film Alice in Wonderland perpetuates the long-standing confusion between the Red Queen and the Queen of Hearts. In the film, the Queen of Hearts delivers several of the Red Queen's lines, notably "all the ways about here belong to me" which in the case of the Red Queen has a double meaning since as a chess piece she can move in any direction.

In both American McGee's Alice and Tim Burton's film adaptation of the books, the two characters are combined. Jefferson Airplane's song "White Rabbit" contains the lyric "and the Red Queen's off her head", despite the fact that "Off with her head!" as a repeated line is associated with the Queen of Hearts, not the Red Queen.

== Popular culture ==
=== Alice in Wonderland (2010) ===
Red Queen
- Alice in Wonderland character
- Helena Bonham Carter as the Red Queen in Tim Burton's 2010 adaptation
- Created by: Lewis Carroll; Tim Burton
- Portrayed by: Helena Bonham Carter (adult); Leilah de Meza (child)

In-universe information
- Full name: Iracebeth of Crims
- Family: King Oleron (father); Queen Elsemere (mother); White Queen (sister)

The 2010 live-action film Alice in Wonderland, fashioned as a sequel to the novel, features Helena Bonham Carter as the Red Queen. Bonham Carter's head was digitally increased three times its original size on screen. Bonham Carter's character is a combination of the Red Queen, the Duchess and the Queen of Hearts. From the original Red Queen, this character gets only a relationship to the White Queen. Here the Red Queen is the elder sister of the White Queen, and is jealous of her sister, whom her subjects genuinely love.

From the original John Tenniel illustrations of the Duchess, she gets a massive head in proportion to her body and a retinue of frog footmen. The White Queen theorizes that the movie's Red Queen has a tumor pressing against her brain, explaining both her large head and her deranged behaviour.

Most of her characteristics are taken from the Queen of Hearts including:

- A quickness to anger, including the famous phrase "Off with his/her/their/your head!" Her first name, Iracebeth, is a play on the word "irascible". In the movie, the queen's moat is full of heads from her many decapitations. Carter has said that she based her performance on her toddler-aged daughter.
- The use of animals as inanimate objects. Beside the flamingo mallets and hedgehog croquet balls from the original, this queen also uses them as furniture.
- Having tarts stolen, although in this adaptation it was a starving frog footman who stole the tarts rather than the Knave of Hearts. Here, the queen is madly in love with the Knave of Hearts, who leads her army, and has executed her husband the King for fear that he would leave her.
- Employment of a fish footman and the White Rabbit.
- Heart motifs throughout her palace and a 16th-century-style costume associated with the queen of hearts playing card and the original John Tenniel illustrations for the Queen of Hearts.

The irritable, snobbish mother of Alice's potential husband, cast as a corresponding villain in the "real world" also resembles the Queen of Hearts when she fumes about her gardeners planting white instead of red roses.

After the Jabberwocky is slain by Alice, the Red Queen's army stops fighting and following her orders. The White Queen banishes the Red Queen to Outland where nobody is to say a word to her or show her any kindness. The Knave of Hearts is also banished and tries to kill the Red Queen when they are shackled together only to be thwarted by the Mad Hatter. As the Red Queen and the Knave of Hearts are carried off to their exile, the Red Queen repeatedly shouts "He tried to kill me" while the Knave of Hearts begged for the White Queen to have him killed.

In the video game adaptation of the film, she plays a minor role, first appearing as a mere illustration. She is not seen in person until near the end of the game, first playing croquet and beheading the hedgehogs she uses as balls whenever they miss their target at her castle, and then again both before and after the battle with the Jabberwocky.

In the sequel of the 2010 film, the Red Queen returns as the main antagonist and Bonham Carter reprises her role. In the film, the Red Queen currently lives in a castle made with vegetation and other things in Outland where she is still exiled and is served by vegetable people whose parts she occasionally eats. In addition, the Knave of Hearts' skeleton is shown in her castle. The Red Queen is the love interest of Time and the two ally: If he will give to her the powerful Chronosphere and kill Alice she will give to him his love and they will rule the universe. When Alice steals the Chronosphere to save Tarrant, the Red Queen orders Time to find her and kill her. The Red Queen's true past is discovered when Alice travels in time: as a child, she was calm and sweet, however her parents favoured her sister over her; one day the Red Queen was accused of eating tarts when it was her sister who ate them. During the tart fiasco, the Red Queen ran away and would fall and crash her head into a grandfather's clock where her head expands turning her into a crazy and hating person. At the day of the coronation, the Red Queen believed that Tarrant was laughing about her large head, and shouts at him. When her father says that her sister will become the queen of Underland, she swears a horrible revenge on Tarrant. During the climax, both Queens are taken back in time where the Queens witnessing the tart event causes a paradox. Once Wonderland was saved from destruction, the White Queen apologizes for lying about the tarts and the two sisters reconcile.

=== Once Upon a Time in Wonderland ===
The Red Queen appears in Once Upon a Time in Wonderland (a spin-off to Once Upon a Time) portrayed by Emma Rigby. She is a character distinct from the Queen of Hearts (Barbara Hershey), who was her tutor in magic. Like the Queen of Hearts and the Mad Hatter, the Red Queen is an émigré to Wonderland from the Enchanted Forest, having originally been a young woman named Anastasia, with whom Will Scarlet (the Knave of Hearts) was in love. The Red Queen featured as one of the show's main antagonists, alongside Jafar.

=== Pandora Hearts ===
Two characters from the manga/anime Pandora Hearts are based on the Red Queen, Alice and Lacie, though Lacie has more in common with the Red Queen than Alice, who also has connections with The Queen of Hearts.

=== American McGee's Alice and Alice: Madness Returns ===
In the American McGee's Alice video game/media franchise by American McGee, The Red Queen is initially conflated with the Queen of Hearts in the first game, American McGee's Alice. The names are used interchangeably, and the chess level further implies the two are one and the same. However, in the second game, Alice: Madness Returns, they are separated once more and the player meets the Queen of Hearts in her original form; the Red Queen is seen at the very beginning of the game as a flashback from Alice's memories of when The Red Queen reigned sovereign in Wonderland. Subsequent to the development of Alice: Otherlands, a proposed spin-off pitch to EA Games (who holds the franchise's copyrights) was initiated by American McGee that included crowdfunding and fan-support using the platform Patreon, entitled "Alice: Asylum." It is revealed in the art book designed for the proposal that the prequel portion of the game features Alice interacting with the two characters as separate entities, with a later cataclysm resulting in their merging into one monstrous creature resembling the form that Alice confronts in the first game (before this form is revealed to be a puppet/avatar extending from tentacles of the Red Queen's gigantic and monstrous true form.

=== DC Comics ===
In the third volume of Shazam!, the Red Queen came from the Wozenderlands and is a member of the Monster Society of Evil. She was among its members imprisoned in the Dungeon of Eternity within the Monsterlands until Mister Mind instructed Doctor Sivana on how to free them. As Shazam fights a Mister Mind-controlled C.C. Batson, Red Queen and Scapegoat ask Mister Mind when they will get a turn. Mister Mind states that they will get their chance once the Magiclands are united. As the Monster Society of Evil continues their fight with the Shazam Family, Scapegoat noted to Red Queen that Black Adam was supposed to be part of the group as Red Queen states that Black Adam refused to follow Mister Mind while having plans to get revenge on Alice and Dorothy Gale. When Scapegoat mentions his plans to get revenge on Mayor Krunket, Superboy-Prime crashes the fight where he uses his fists to impale Scapegoat as he states to Red Queen that he's going to play around first before he gets serious. When Shazam defeats Mister Mind, the resulting magical energy knocked out the Red Queen and the rest of the Monster Society of Evil. The Monster Society of Evil was mentioned to have been remanded to Rock Falls Penitentiary where the Shazam Family built a special section to contain magical threats.

=== Come Away ===
The Red Queen is played by Anna Chancellor in the 2020 movie Come Away. This version of the Red Queen is depicted as the imaginary counterpart to Eleanor Morrow, Alice's maternal aunt and the older sister of Alice's mother Rose (Angelina Jolie), whose imaginary counterpart is the Queen of Hearts.

=== Resident Evil ===
In the Resident Evil series of video games and films the Red Queen is a self-aware computer system created to monitor and protect the Umbrella Corporation, an organisation dedicated to destroying almost all the human race as a method of dealing with ecological collapse. Its holographic avatar is modelled after Alicia, the young daughter of the original founder of the corporation.

=== Other ===
Christina Henry has authored The Red Queen a spin-off novel based on the character as part of a series based on the books.

== Adaptive uses outside the arts ==
=== In science ===
- The Red Queen hypothesis is an evolutionary hypothesis taken from the Red Queen's race in Through the Looking-Glass.
- Science writer Matt Ridley popularized the term "the red queen" in connection with sexual selection (See Evolution of sex for more details).

=== In business ===
- "Red Queen marketing" is defined as the business practice of launching new products in order to replace past failed launches while the overall sales of a brand may remain static or growth is less than fully incremental.
