= Humpty Dumpty =

Nursery rhyme character

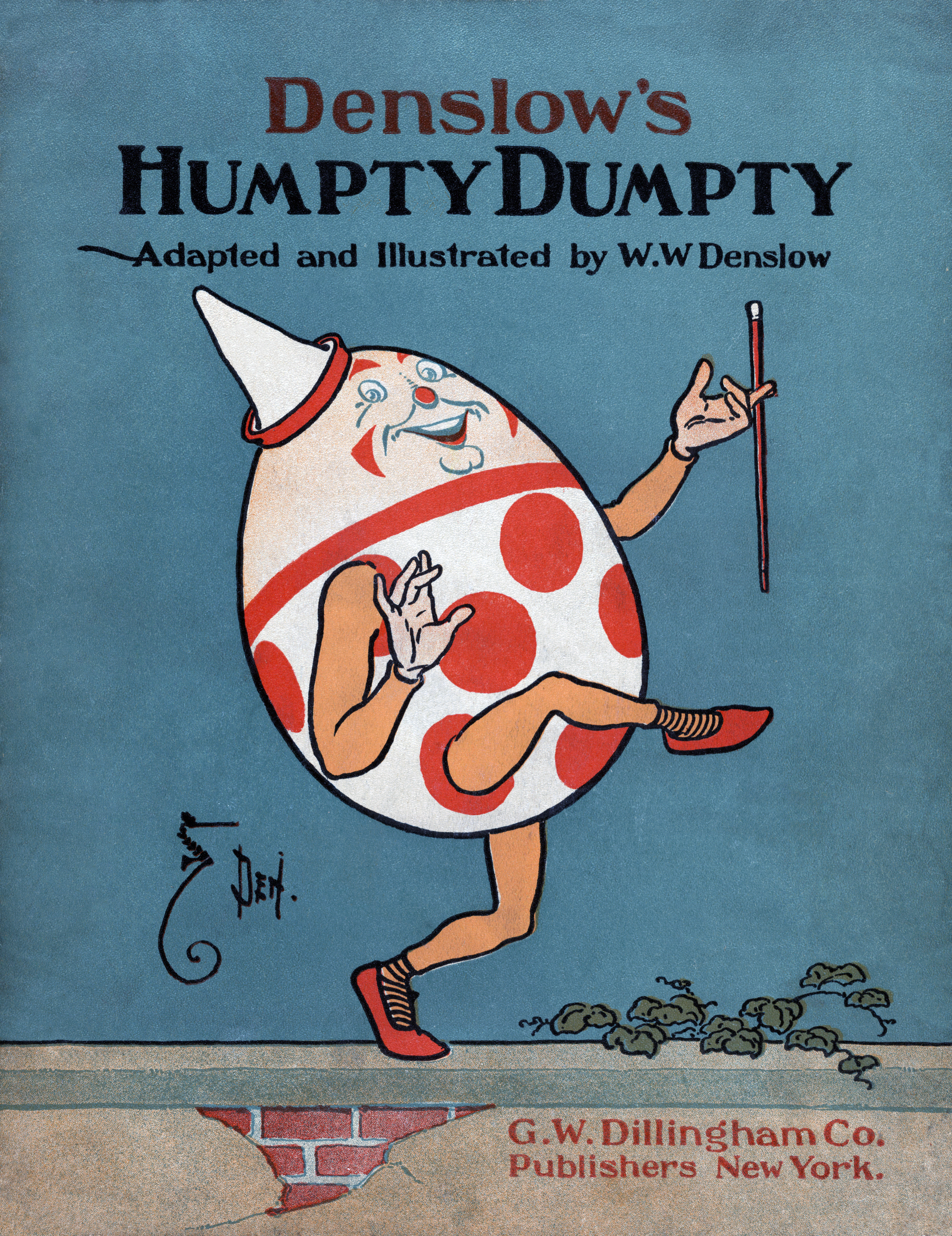
- Illustration by W. W. Denslow, 1904

Nursery rhyme
- Published: 1797

Humpty Dumpty is a character in an English nursery rhyme, probably originally a riddle, and is typically portrayed as an anthropomorphic egg, though he is not explicitly described as such. The first recorded versions of the rhyme date from late eighteenth-century England and the tune from 1870 in James William Elliott's National Nursery Rhymes and Nursery Songs. Its origins are obscure, and several theories have been advanced to suggest original meanings. The rhyme is listed in the Roud Folk Song Index as No. 13026.

As a figure in nursery culture, the character appears under a variety of near-rhyming names, such as Lille Trille (Danish), Wirgele-Wargele (German), Hümpelken-Pümpelken (German) and Hobberti Bob (Pennsylvania Dutch). As a character and literary allusion, Humpty Dumpty was referred to in several works of literature and popular culture in the nineteenth century. Lewis Carroll in particular made him an animated egg in his 1871 book Through the Looking-Glass, while in the United States the character was popularised by George L. Fox as a clown of that name in the Broadway pantomime musical Humpty Dumpty (1868).

== Lyrics and melody ==
The rhyme is well known in the English language. The common text from 1882 is:

Humpty Dumpty sat on a wall.
Humpty Dumpty had a great fall.
All the king's horses and all the king's men
Couldn't put Humpty together again.

It is a single quatrain with external rhymes that follow the pattern of AABB and with a trochaic metre, which is common in nursery rhymes. The melody commonly associated with the rhyme was first recorded by composer and nursery rhyme collector James William Elliott in his National Nursery Rhymes and Nursery Songs (London, 1870), as outlined below:

== Origins ==
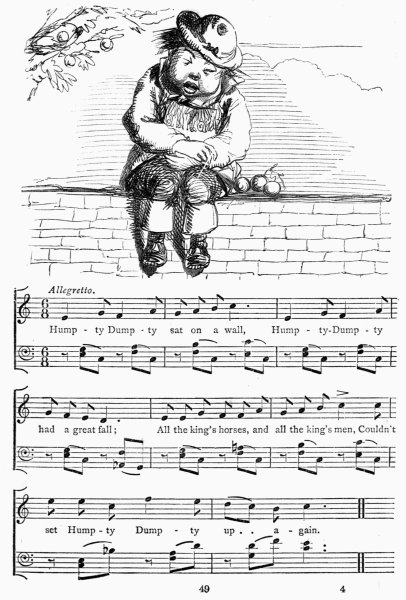
Illustration from Walter Crane's Mother Goose's Nursery Rhymes (1877), showing Humpty Dumpty as a boy

The earliest known version was published in Samuel Arnold's Juvenile Amusements in 1797 with the lyrics:

Humpty Dumpty sat on a wall,
Humpty Dumpty had a great fall.
Four-score Men and Four-score more,
Could not make Humpty Dumpty where he was before.

A manuscript addition to a copy of Mother Goose's Melody published in 1803 has the modern version with a different last line: "Could not set Humpty Dumpty up again". It was published in 1810 in a version of Gammer Gurton's Garland. (Note: Original spelling variations left intact.)

Humpty Dumpty sate on a wall,
Humpti Dumpti had a great fall;
Threescore men and threescore more,
Cannot place Humpty dumpty as he was before.

In 1841 an anthology of Latin and Greek translations of popular literature was published under the title Arudines Cami which included a version of the rhyme in Latin translation by Henry Drury. The final two English lines translated in this case now read

Not all the king's horses, nor all the queen's men,
Could put Humpty Dumpty on the wall again.

In 1842, James Orchard Halliwell published an alternative version in his collection of The Nursery Rhymes of England:

Humpty Dumpty lay in a beck.
With all his sinews around his neck;
Forty Doctors and forty wrights
Couldn't put Humpty Dumpty to rights!

Evidence of an alternative American version closer to the modern received rhyme quoted above is given by William Carey Richards in the issue of a children's magazine for 1843, where he comments that he had come across it as a riddle when he was five years old and that the answer was "an egg".

According to the Oxford English Dictionary, in the seventeenth century, the term "humpty dumpty" referred to a drink of brandy boiled with ale. The riddle probably exploited, for misdirection, the fact that "humpty dumpty" was also eighteenth-century reduplicative slang for a short and clumsy person. The riddle may depend upon the assumption that a clumsy person falling off a wall might not be irreparably damaged, whereas an egg would be. The rhyme is no longer posed as a riddle, since the answer is now so well known. Similar riddles have been recorded by folklorists in other languages, such as "Boule Boule" in French, "Lille Trille" in Swedish and Norwegian, and "Runtzelken-Puntzelken" or "Hümpelken-Pümpelken" in different parts of Germany—although none is as widely known as Humpty Dumpty is in English.

== Meaning ==
The rhyme does not explicitly state that the subject is an egg, possibly because it may have been originally posed as a riddle. There are also various theories of an original "Humpty Dumpty". One, advanced by Katherine Elwes Thomas in 1930 and adopted by Robert Ripley, posits that Humpty Dumpty is King Richard III of England, depicted as hunchbacked in Tudor histories and particularly in Shakespeare's play, and who was defeated, despite his armies, at Bosworth Field in 1485.

In 1785, Francis Grose's Classical Dictionary of the Vulgar Tongue noted that a "Humpty Dumpty" was "a short clumsey [sic] person of either sex, also ale boiled with brandy"; no mention was made of the rhyme. The name is also commonly applied to a person in an insecure position, something that would be difficult to reconstruct once broken, or a short and fat person.

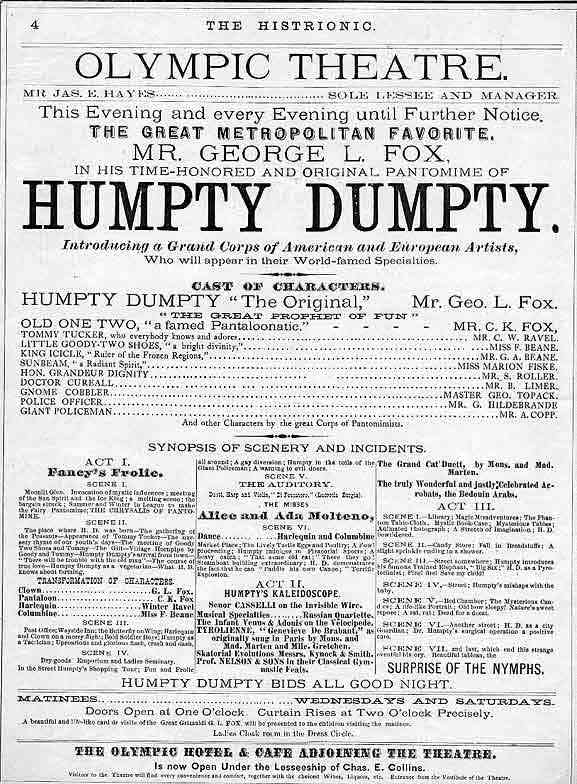
Poster advertising the 1868 American pantomime starring George L. Fox

Professor David Daube suggested in The Oxford Magazine of 16 February 1956 that Humpty Dumpty was a "tortoise" siege engine, an armored frame, used unsuccessfully to approach the walls of the Parliamentary-held city of Gloucester in 1643 during the Siege of Gloucester in the English Civil War. This was on the basis of a contemporary account of the attack, but without evidence that the rhyme was connected. The theory was part of an anonymous series of articles on the origin of nursery rhymes and was widely acclaimed in academia, but it was derided by others as "ingenuity for ingenuity's sake" and declared to be a spoof. The link was nevertheless popularized by a children's opera All the King's Men by Richard Rodney Bennett, first performed in 1969.

From 1996, the website of the Colchester tourist board attributed the origin of the rhyme to a cannon recorded as used from the church of St Mary-at-the-Walls by the Royalist defenders in the siege of 1648. In 1648, Colchester was a walled town with a castle and several churches and was protected by the city wall. The story given was that a large cannon, which the website claimed was colloquially called Humpty Dumpty, was strategically placed on the wall. A shot from a Parliamentary cannon succeeded in damaging the wall beneath Humpty Dumpty, which caused the cannon to tumble to the ground. The Royalists (or Cavaliers, "all the King's men") attempted to raise Humpty Dumpty on to another part of the wall, but the cannon was so heavy that "All the King's horses and all the King's men couldn't put Humpty together again". Author Albert Jack claimed in his 2008 book Pop Goes the Weasel: The Secret Meanings of Nursery Rhymes that there were two other verses supporting this claim. Elsewhere, he claimed to have found them in an "old dusty library, [in] an even older book", but did not state what the book was or where it was found. It has been pointed out that the two additional verses are not in the style of the seventeenth century or of the existing rhyme, and that they do not fit with the earliest printed versions of the rhyme, which do not mention horses and men.

== Adaptations ==
American actor George L. Fox helped to popularise the nursery rhyme character in a nineteenth-century pantomime on Broadway, where he figures as a clown. During the nineteenth century, too, Humpty Dumpty gave his name to a number of musical items, dependent either on the nursery rhyme or on the pantomime. They include Alfred Caldicott's glee of 1878 and E. P. Sweeting's round of 1893, as well as Walford Davies' 1907 Humpty Dumpty, described as "a short cantata for children, consisting of a prelude, four short settings of the old nursery rhyme, and part of the scene between Alice and Humpty Dumpty (from Alice Through the Looking-Glass)". There were also purely musical items in the US, such as the 1875 galop by Harry R. Williams, the 1876 polka by E. Jullian Gray and the 1900 schottische by H. Engelmann.

=== Lewis Carroll's Through the Looking-Glass ===
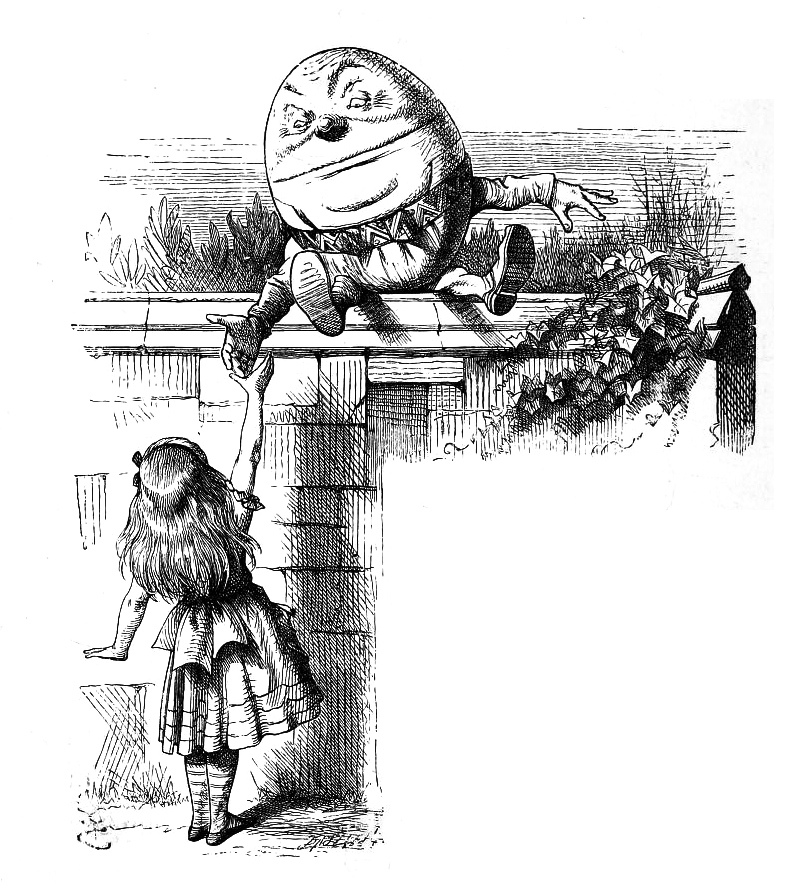
Humpty Dumpty and Alice, from Through the Looking-Glass. Illustration by John Tenniel

Humpty Dumpty makes an appearance in Lewis Carroll's Through the Looking-Glass (1871). There Alice remarks that Humpty is "exactly like an egg", which Humpty finds to be "very provoking". Alice clarifies that she said he looks like an egg, not that he is one. They then go on to discuss semantics and pragmatics when Humpty Dumpty says, "my name means the shape I am".

A. J. Larner suggested that Carroll's Humpty Dumpty had prosopagnosia on the basis of his description of his finding faces hard to recognise:

"The face is what one goes by, generally," Alice remarked in a thoughtful tone.

"That's just what I complain of," said Humpty Dumpty. "Your face is the same as everybody has—the two eyes,—" (marking their places in the air with his thumb) "nose in the middle, mouth under. It's always the same. Now if you had the two eyes on the same side of the nose, for instance—or the mouth at the top—that would be some help."

=== James Joyce's Finnegans Wake ===
James Joyce used the story of Humpty Dumpty as a recurring motif of the Fall of Man in the 1939 novel Finnegans Wake. One of the most easily recognizable references is at the end of the second chapter, in the first verse of the Ballad of Persse O'Reilly:

Have you heard of one Humpty Dumpty
How he fell with a roll and a rumble
And curled up like Lord Olofa Crumple
By the butt of the Magazine Wall,
(Chorus) Of the Magazine Wall,
Hump, helmet and all?

=== In science ===
Humpty Dumpty has been used to demonstrate the second law of thermodynamics. The law describes a process known as entropy, a measure of the number of specific ways in which a system may be arranged, often taken to be a measure of "disorder". The higher the entropy, the higher the disorder. After his fall and subsequent shattering, the inability to put him together again is representative of this principle, as it would be highly unlikely (though not impossible) to return him to his earlier state of lower entropy, as the entropy of an isolated system never decreases.

== See also ==
- List of nursery rhymes
