= Barnacle Bill =

Barnacle Bill may refer to:

- Barnacle Bill (theme tune), the theme tune of the BBC children's TV programme Blue Peter
- William Bernard (sailor), subject of the song
- Barnacle Bill (Martian rock), a 40-cm rock on Mars in Ares Vallis
- Barnacle Bill (1930 film), a Fleischer Studios animated short film
- Barnacle Bill (1935 film), a film starring Archie Pitt and Joan Gardner
- Barnacle Bill (1941 film), a film starring Wallace Beery and Marjorie Main
- Barnacle Bill (1957 film), an Ealing Studios comedy film starring Alec Guinness
- Barnacle Bill, Popeye's rival for Olive Oyl in the 1935 animated cartoon Beware of Barnacle Bill
- Barnacle Bill and the Seven Seas, a fictional musical group in the animated series SpongeBob SquarePants
- "Barnacle Bill the Sailor", an American drinking song
- Barnacle Bill, a talking parrot from Bahia belonging to Rear Admiral Albert B. Randall
