= Old 97 =

Old 97 may refer to:

- Wreck of the Old 97, 1903 American train wreck of the Fast Mail, which was itself known as "Old 97", and subsequent ballad
- Old 97's, American alternative rock group active 1993–present
