= Barnacle Bill (1930 film) =

1930 film

- Directed by: Dave Fleischer
- Produced by: Max Fleischer
- Starring: Margie Hines; Billy Murray; Billy Costello
- Music by: Sammy Timberg
- Animation by: Seymour Kneitel; Rudy Zamora
- Color process: Black-and-white
- Production company: Fleischer Studios
- Distributed by: Paramount Publix Corporation
- Release date: August 30, 1930
- Running time: 8 minutes
- Country: United States
- Language: English

Barnacle Bill is a 1930 Fleischer Studios animated short film. It is part of the Talkartoons series, and featured Betty Boop (here called "Nancy Lee") and Bimbo (as "Barnacle Bill").

Due to being published in 1930, the cartoon entered the public domain on January 1, 2026.

== Plot ==
Barnacle Bill (Bimbo) is a sailor on a ship that has just come into port. As soon as he can get off the ship, he heads for Nancy Lee's (Betty Boop) house. When he gets there he begins knocking on her door. Bimbo and Betty begin singing the lyrics to a tame version of "Barnacle Bill the Sailor". The actions of the film follow along the song's storyline, with Barnacle Bimbo romancing Betty and then leaving her to go back to sea.

== Cast ==
- Billy Costello as Captain Gus Gorilla (uncredited)
- Margie Hines as Betty Boop (voice) (uncredited)
- Billy Murray as Bimbo (voice) (uncredited)

== Production notes ==
Like many early Fleischer Studios films, this film was inspired by a popular song, a version of "Barnacle Bill" written in 1928 by Frank Luther & Carson Robison and performed by Hoagy Carmichael. It has nothing to do with William Bernard, the sailor and California Gold Rush character known as "Barnacle Bill". Ironically, Fleischer Studios also produced a Popeye cartoon, Beware of Barnacle Bill in 1935, using the same song as aforementioned, almost 5 years after Betty Boop cartoon Barnacle Bill was released, with Bluto as Barnacle Bill the Sailor portraying the character after Bimbo.

In this cartoon, Betty Boop still retains some of the canine physical characteristics that she had in her first screen appearance, Dizzy Dishes.
