= Calamity Jane (disambiguation) =

Calamity Jane (1852–1903) was an American frontierswoman.

Calamity Jane may also refer to:

== Film ==
- Calamity Jane (1953 film), an American Technicolor western musical film starring Doris Day and Howard Keel
- Calamity, a Childhood of Martha Jane Cannary (2020 film), a French-Dutch animated family feature film
- Calamity Jane (2024 film), a Western film

== Music ==
- Calamity Jane (country music band), an American, all-female country music band
- Calamity Jane (grunge band), an all-female American grunge/punk band
- Calamity Jane (soundtrack), a 10″ LP of songs sung by Doris Day and Howard Keel from the 1953 film
- "Calamity Jane", a song by French pop singer and actress Camélia Jordana
- "Calamity Jane (From The West)", a 1929 song by Vernon Dalhart and Adelyne Hood
- "The Awakening"/"Calamity Jane", a 1994 Hard House single by Mrs Wood

== Other uses ==
- Calamity Jane (Lucky Luke), a Lucky Luke comic written by Goscinny and illustrated by Morris
- Calamity Jane (musical), a stage musical based on the historical frontierswoman Calamity Jane
- The Legend of Calamity Jane, an American/French animated television series produced by Canal+ and France 3

== See also ==
- Calamity Jane and Sam Bass, a 1949 American Western film
