= Albert B. Randall =

American naval officer

Rear Admiral Albert B. Randall, U.S.N.R., (September 10, 1879 - December 1, 1945) served as the Commandant of the US Maritime Service and retired as the Commodore of the Fleet of the United States Lines. He was descended from Stephen Randall, one of the first settlers of Middle Island, New York. Nicknamed 'Rescue Randall' for rescues at sea, He was a friend to President Franklin D. Roosevelt and gained the distinction of being the first merchant marine officer ever to receive the high rank of rear admiral, in September 1941.

== Early years ==
Born on September 10, 1879, in Brookhaven, New York, Albert Randall was the son of William F. Randall, a native of Middle Island, New York, and Sarah E. Smith, a native of Brookhaven. After his birth, the family relocated to Bridgeport, Connecticut, where Albert received his education and later attended Vermont Academy. When he was 13 he built a yellow canoe from barrel hoops, canvas and staves that he floated at the Bridgeport docks, presaging a yearning for the water. There are mariners in the Randall family tree including one that sailed with the legendary John Paul Jones of Revolutionary war fame and he began his career on sailing ships

== Officer ==
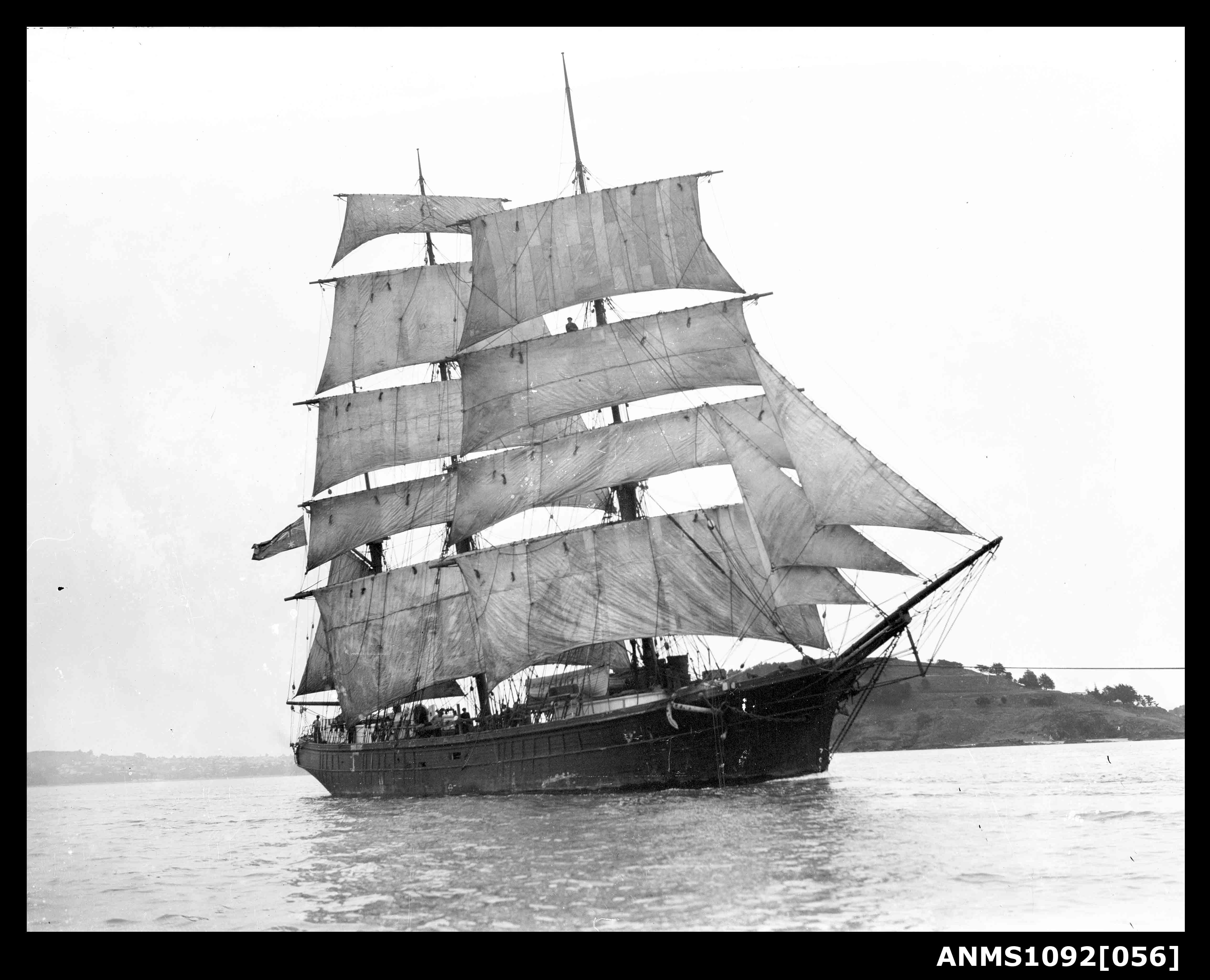
Barque underway with sails set

At the age of 17, Albert Randall embarked on his maritime journey as an ordinary seaman aboard the barque Obed Baxter, which was captained by a cousin of his. A square-rigger, it eventually went around the world. Over the following years, he gained extensive experience in Asiatic waters, serving as a ship's officer on army transports such as Burnside, Sedgwick, and Kilpatrick, voyaging to and from the Philippines and the West Indies. In Bahia he picked up a talking parrot he named "Barnacle Bill".

In 1901, Randall joined the Navy Auxiliary Service and assumed the position of third officer on the Ajax. His career progressed steadily, and he earned promotions to increasingly responsible roles. By 1905, he had obtained his Master's license, and in 1907, he assumed command of his first vessel.

== WWI and Fleet service ==
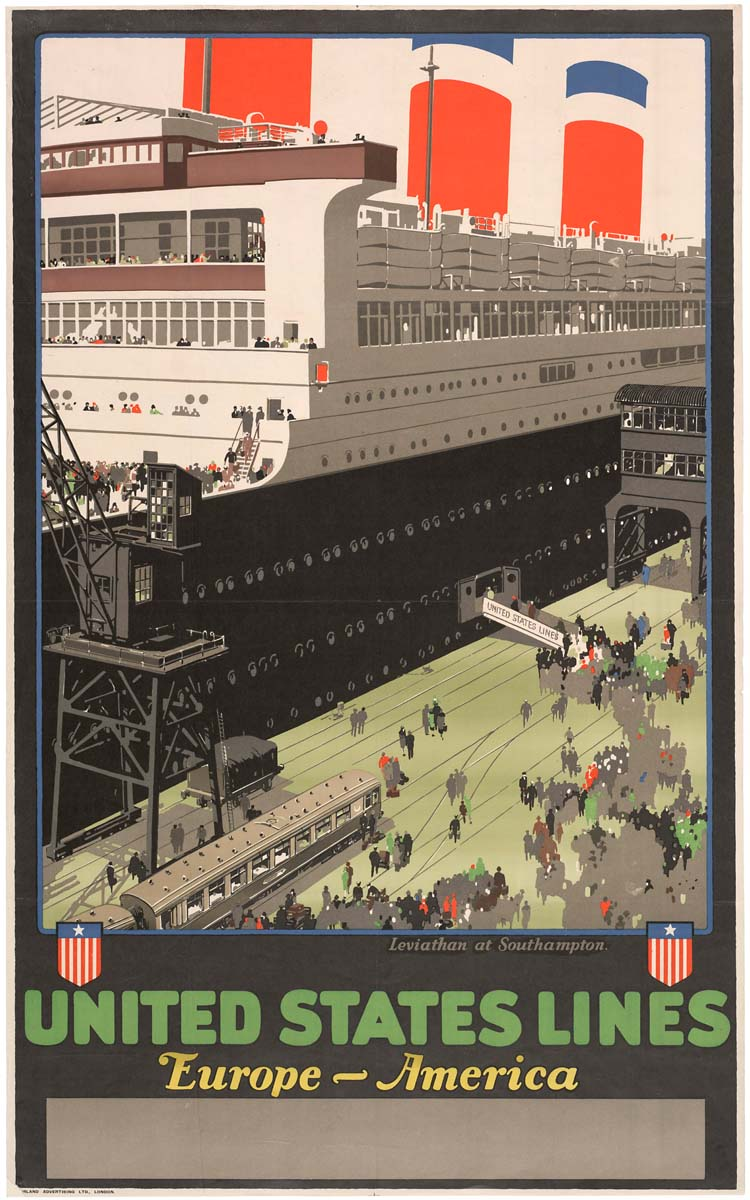
Poster of SS Leviathan - NARA - 594952

During World War I, Captain Randall's exceptional contributions to convoy activities earned him recognition and accolades, including the prestigious Legion of Honor bestowed upon him by France. The German U-boats (Unterseeboots) resumed unrestricted attacks against all ships in the Atlantic, including civilian passenger carriers. Although concerned the U.S. might react with intervention, German military leaders calculated they could defeat the allies before the U.S. could mobilize and arm troops to land in Europe. Admiral Randall saw the German subs take out many of the ships in his convoys, but was finally a victim of a torpedo while a returning passenger on the President Lincoln in May, 1918 . In 1921, he assumed command of the S.S. American, followed by taking charge of the SS George Washington later that same year.. It played a significant role in transporting troops to and from France, carrying approximately 100,000 soldiers.

The George Washington also served as the vessel for important diplomatic and historical events. President Woodrow Wilson traveled on the ship to attend the Versailles Peace Conference, which took place in France in 1919. Additionally, the King and Queen of Belgium visited the United States and sailed on the George Washington.

In 1921, 250 members of the American Legion, a veterans' organization, embarked on the George Washington as guests of the French Government. They voyaged to France to commemorate and honor the soldiers who had fought in World War I.

== Remarkable rescue ==
One notable rescue took place in 1922 off the coast of Newfoundland, involving the French schooner Rhein de Mers.

The Rhein de Mers was in a desperate situation, with a damaged rudder and sails and its skipper lost overboard. The President Fillmore, commanded by Captain Randall, happened to come across the struggling vessel. Despite challenging conditions, including rough seas, Captain Randall successfully rescued every surviving member of the Rhein de Mers crew. The Alexandria Gazette noted that this rescue took place less than four months after Randall was acquitted on charges that he "had passed a party of fishermen adrift in an open dory without making any effort to pick them up".

Over the following 15 years, Captain Randall commanded a series of luxury liners, including the Republic, the Leviathan, and the Manhattan, which carried more than 300 members of the United States Olympic to the 1936 Olympic Games in Berlin.

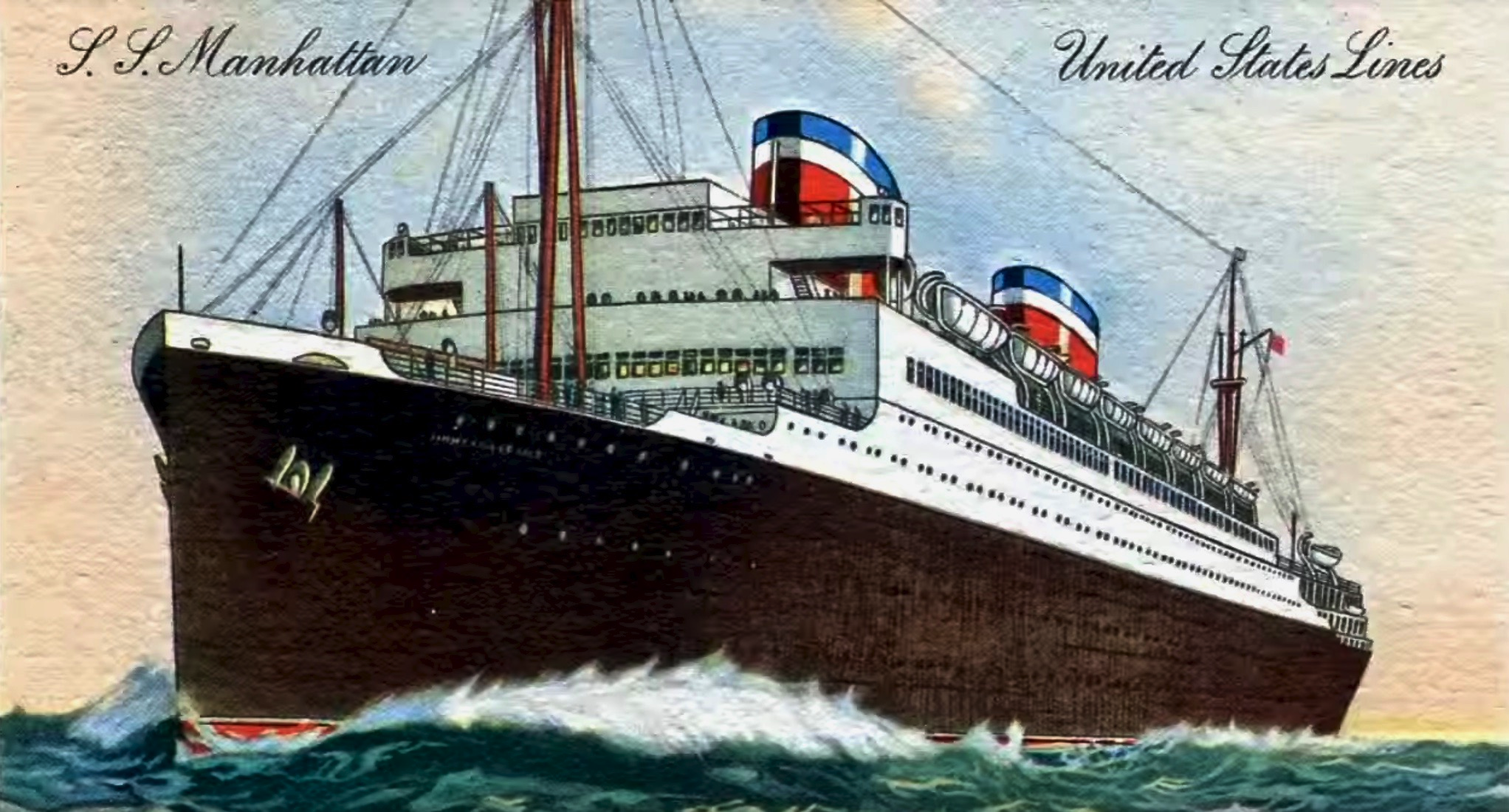
Ss manhattan 1931 united states line

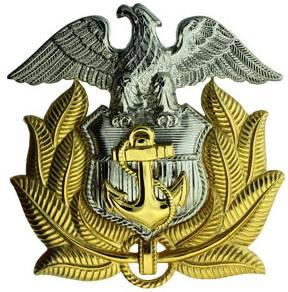
US_Merchant_Marine_Cap_Insignia

Ultimately, Captain Albert Randall's career culminated in his promotion to the esteemed position of Commodore of the fleet aboard the flagship Manhattan. His remarkable achievements, from his beginnings as an ordinary seaman to his command of notable vessels, show his dedication and skill within the maritime industry. Upon retirement in 1939 he was presented with a letter of commendation from Franklin D. Roosevelt, on his service, and in September 1941 was promoted to the rank of Rear Admiral.

My Dear Captain Randall;

I take the occasion of your retirement to congratulate you on a long and distinguished career. Your years of service have been marked by many exploits requiring the highest qualities of seamanship and command. As Commodore of the United States Lines, you commanded the greatest vessels in the American Merchant Marine, and proved yourself worthy in all respects of the prominent position that you held. Your career may well be the inspiration of American youth as we enter into a new phase and era of expansion. Your services with the armed forces of the United States as well as with the Merchant Marines illustrate the interdependence of the navy and the merchant marine for the eventual well being of our country

Very sincerely yours,

Franklin Delano Roosevelt
President of the United States

== WWII ==
As the skipper of the Manhattan, his return from Europe in the first week of the war was well noted, the ship had taken on 400 extra passengers rushing to leave the war zones and arrived safely. Leaving England In October 1939 Manhattan carried passengers, mostly Americans, from England (then at war with Germany) to New York. Also on the ship, Child refugees of the Kindertransport.

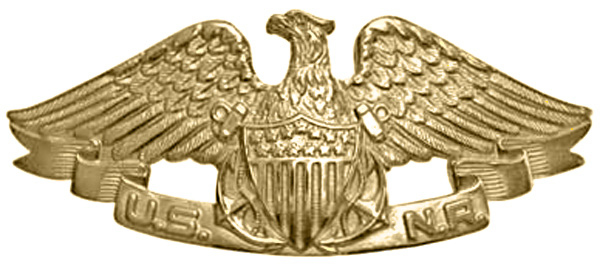
USNR Qualification Pin

Randall turned down an offer to become Commodore of the United States Lines and retired. In 1943, however, he was recalled in 1943 by Roosevelt to lead troop transports and to guide convoys of over 20 ships across the Atlantic to the war zone. He held the position of Commandant of the United States Maritime Service from March 31, 1943, until April 30, 1945. His active duty concluded on May 10, 1945.

== Awards ==
- Recommended for the Distinguished Service Medal for safely transferred all hands and troops of the transport Powhatan which foundered in a gale during WWI.
- French Legion of Honour Rank of the Chevalier.

== Death ==
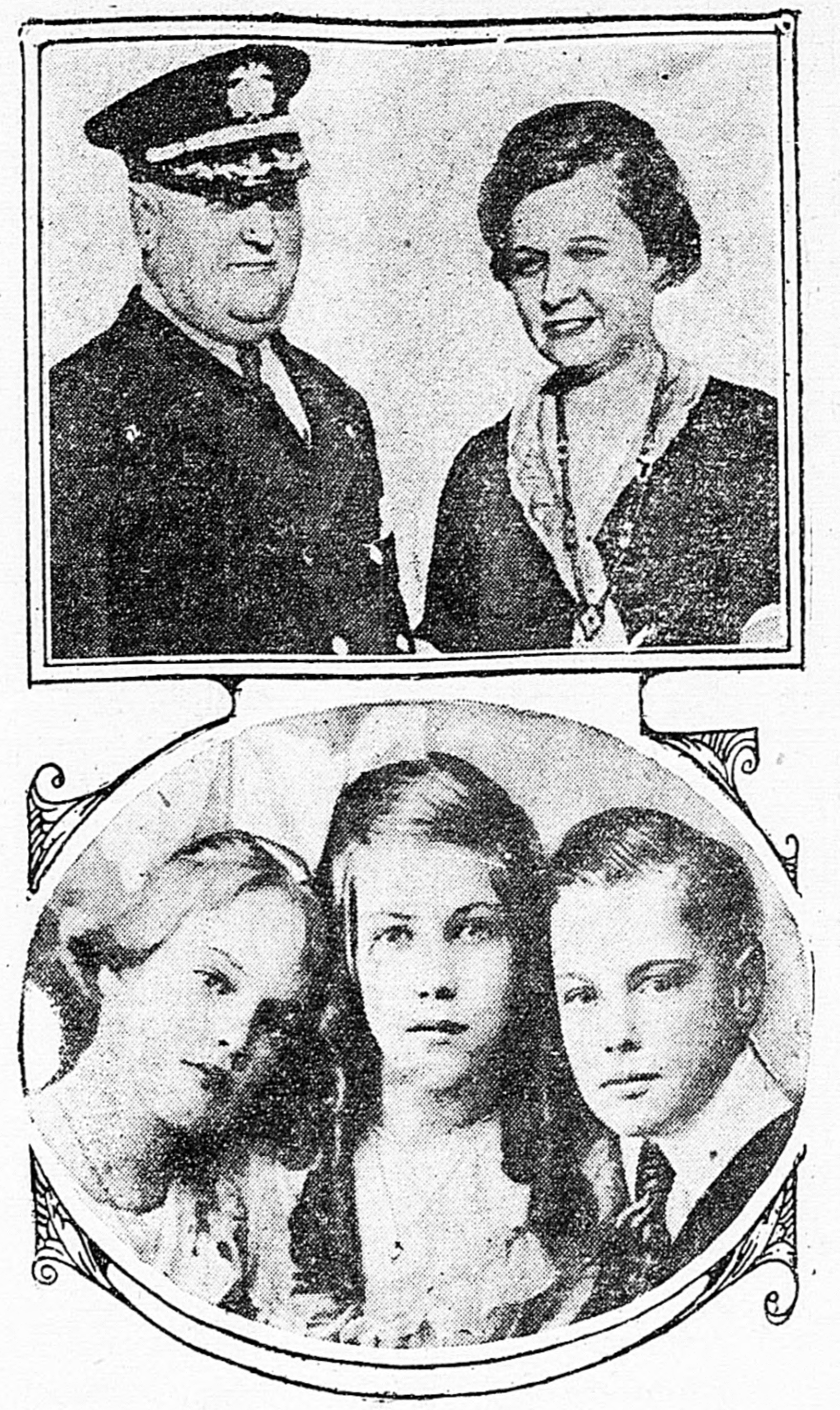
Captain Albert Randall and family

He died on December 1, 1945, at the age of 66. He was survived by his wife, Mrs. Dorothy Randall, as well as a son, Lieut Comdr. A. B. Randall Jr., and two daughters, Mrs. Eugene Mooney and Mrs. Elizabeth Hain.

== See also ==
- William Bernard (sailor)
- Barnacle Bill the Sailor
