= Remember Pearl Harbor (slogan) =

United States slogan

Remember Pearl Harbor was a slogan or saying popular in the United States after the Japanese attack on Pearl Harbor on December 7, 1941. Commander Lewis Preston Harris first coined the phrase "Remember Pearl Harbor".

It was also the name of a song by artist Sammy Kaye, sometimes cited as "Let's Remember Pearl Harbor," recorded ten days after the outbreak of the war.

Another song of the same title was written by Frank Luther and performed by Carson J. Robison and his orchestra.

== See also ==
- Remember Pearl Harbor (motion picture)
