= Barnacle Bill the Sailor =

American drinking song

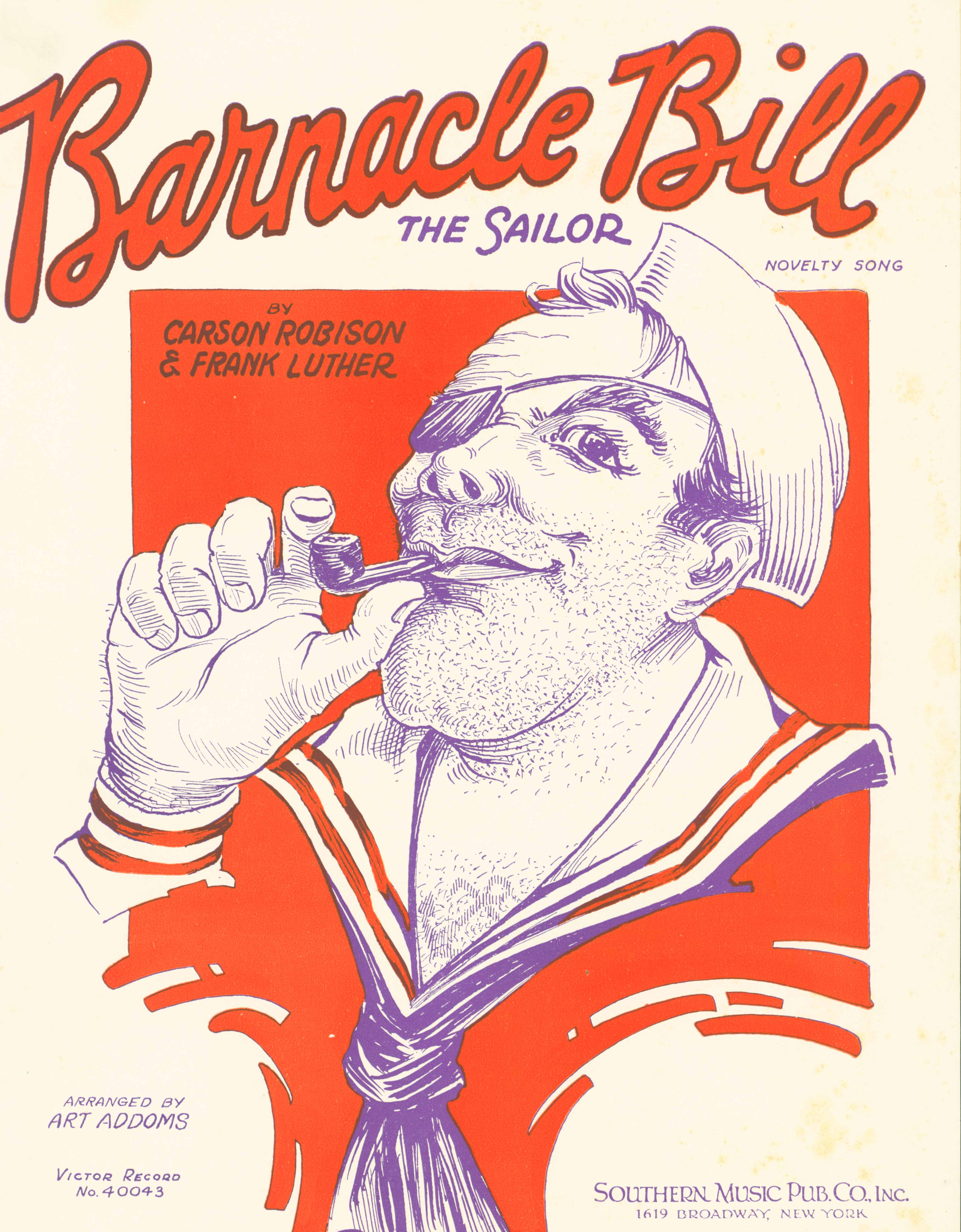
Sheet music cover, 1929

"Barnacle Bill the Sailor" (Roud 4704) is an American drinking song adapted from "Bollocky Bill the Sailor", a traditional folk song originally titled "Abraham Brown".

== History ==
There are several versions of the bawdy song in the Gordon "Inferno" Collection at the Library of Congress folklife archive. The first printed version of the song is in the public domain book Immortalia (1927). Later versions feature the eponymous "Barnacle Bill", a fictional character loosely based on a 19th-century San Francisco sailor and Gold Rush miner named William Bernard. Versions are also known in England and Scotland from the early twentieth century.

The earliest known recording is an expurgated adaptation by Carson Robison and Frank Luther in 1928. A recording was released in 1929 by Bud Billings for Victor Records. This song was also recorded on May 21, 1930 by Bix Beiderbecke and Hoagy Carmichael with Carson Robison on vocals and released as a Victor 78, V-38139-A and 25371. In 1996 it was released on CD on the album Bix Beiderbecke 1927–1930. According to Philip R. Evans, Bix Beiderbecke's biographer, in the second chorus of this recording, violinist Joe Venuti can be heard singing "Barnacle Bill the Shit-head," either to express his attitude toward the record producer, or typical of his wacky sense of humor. Esten Spurrier, a friend of Beiderbecke, is quoted by Evans as saying that Beiderbecke told him he could not believe the record would be pressed and had felt that it had been done just for laughs. Beiderbecke cut loose on the tune with what is believed to be one of his finest cornet solos. John Valby (also known as "Dr. Dirty") also recorded the song.

The tune has inspired a Fleischer Studios Betty Boop cartoon and two films, as well as the name of a rock on Mars. Louis Jordan and the Tympany Five (then known as The Elks Rendezvous Band) recorded a clean version in 1938. In the first Fleischer Popeye cartoon, Popeye the Sailor (1933), "Barnacle Bill" was used as the recurring theme for the Bluto character. A later Fleischer Popeye cartoon, Beware of Barnacle Bill (1935), is a mock operetta based around a toned-down version of the song.

== Example of lyrics ==
Although versions differ in their content "Barnacle Bill" is structured as an exchange between Bill and a "fair young maiden." Each verse opens with inquiries by the maiden and continues with Bill's response.

=== Ballochy Bill The Sailor (1927) ===
This version is credited to Anonymous and appears in Immortalia (1927). It is published as lyrics only with no indication of key or meter.

"Who is knocking at my door,"
Said the fair young maiden.
"Who is knocking at my door,"
Said the fair young maiden.

"Open the door and let me in,"
Said Ballochy Bill the sailor;
"Open the door and let me in,"
Said Ballochy Bill the sailor.

"You may sleep upon the floor,"
Said the fair young maiden.
"To hell with the floor, I can't fuck that,"
Said Ballochy Bill the sailor.

"You may lie down at my side,"
Said the fair young maiden.
"To hell with your side, I can't fuck that,"
Said Ballochy Bill the sailor.

"You may lie between my thighs,"
Said the fair young maiden.
"What've you got between your thighs?"
Said Ballochy Bill the sailor.

"O, I've got a nice pin-cushion,"
Said the fair young maiden.
"And I've got a pin that will just fit in,"
Said Ballochy Bill the sailor.

"But what if we have a baby?"
Said the fair young maiden.
"Strangle the bastard and throw him away,"
Said Ballochy Bill the sailor.

"But what about the law, sir,"
Said the fair young maiden.
"Kick the bleeders out on their ass,"
Said Ballochy Bill the sailor.

"But what if there's an inquest?"
Said the fair young maiden.
"Then shove the inquest up your cunt,"
Said Ballochy Bill the sailor.

"And what about my paw and maw?"
Said the fair young maiden.
"Fuck your maw, and bugger your paw,"
Said Ballochy Bill the sailor.

"Whenever shall I see you?"
Said the fair young maiden.
"Whenever shall I see you?"
Said the fair young maiden.

"Never no more you dirty whore,"
Said Ballochy Bill the sailor.
"Never no more you dirty whore,"
Said Ballochy Bill the sailor.

=== Abraham Brown The Sailor (date unknown) ===
Walter Newton Henry Harding (1883-1973) collected over 15,000 ballads from mostly 19th-century, with many 18th-century items. Among them is an undated transcript of Abraham Brown The Sailor, noted as being to the tune of My Heart and Lute. It is presented below as originally typeset.

Who is it knocks at our door,
Says a very nice young lady.
Who is it, &c.

It's I myself and nobody else,
Says Abraham Brown the Sailor,
Ti's I myself, &c.

Oh! open the door and let him in,
Says this very nice young lady,
And where am I to sleep to night,
Says Abraham Brown the Sailor

You may sleep on my soft puncushion,
Says this very nice young lady,
And I've a pin, I'll run it in,
Says Abraham Brown the Sailor

I feel it rise between my —
Says this very nice young lady,
It's in your — up to the rim,
Says Abraham Brown the Sailor

Ah! now it's in let it remain,
Says this very nice young lady,
I'll be d—d if I do, I shall want it
Says Abraham Brown &c.(again)

When shall I have your pin again?
Says this very nice young lady,
When I can make it stand again,
Says Abraham Brown &c.
