= Frank Luther =

American singer, playwright, songwriter and pianist

Frank Luther (born Francis Luther Crow, August 4, 1899 – November 16, 1980), also known as Bud Billings, was an American country music singer, dance band vocalist, playwright, songwriter and pianist.

== Early life ==
Born on a farm near Lakin, Kansas, 40 miles from the Colorado border, he was raised on a farm near Hutchinson, Kansas, where his father, William R. Crow, and mother, Gertrude Phillips Crow, dealt in livestock and trotting horses. He began to study piano at age six, improvising his own music when repetitious exercises bored him, and began vocal instruction at 13.

When he was 16, he toured the Midwest as tenor with a quartet called The Meistersingers. He began studying at the University of Kansas, but attended a revival meeting conducted by evangelist Jesse Kellems and accepted an offer to become his musical director. During a subsequent stop in Iola, Kansas, Crow was ordained, despite his never having studied for the ministry.

== Career ==
By 1921, Crow was in the pulpit of the First Christian Church in Bakersfield, California. There, he organized a 30-voice children's choir, an 80-voice adult choir, and two church orchestras. Writing and delivering his weekly sermons proved more problematic, and the Boy Preacher, as he was known locally, resigned to devote his creative energies to the world of music.

Returning to Kansas, he married vocalist and musician Zora Layman on May 8, 1920, and the couple eventually relocated to New York City. In 1926, he was seriously pursuing further vocal training when he was invited to join the DeReszke Singers, as tenor/accompanist. They declared his surname, Crow, to be un-musical, and so he dropped it and became Frank Luther from that day on. The quartet toured with humorist Will Rogers, with whom Luther spent considerable time while on the road.

Luther joined a popular quartet, The Revelers, as tenor in 1927. They toured the British Isles, where Luther met the future Queen of the United Kingdom and did a set accompanied on the drums by the Prince of Wales.

=== Country music ===
In 1928, with his singing only gradually returning to top form, Luther met and became acquainted with fellow Kansan Carson Robison, who had teamed with tenor Vernon Dalhart to make many dozens of top-selling recordings of rural American favorites, shortly to be known in the trade as hillbilly music. Robison and Dalhart were severing their recording partnership, and it was suggested that Luther listen to some Dalhart records and seek to approximate his style. From 1928 to 1932, Luther recorded country music with Robison. Their recordings, made for several record companies and issued on a variety of labels, were extremely popular. "Barnacle Bill the Sailor", "When Your Hair Has Turned to Silver", "When It's Springtime in the Rockies", "When the Bloom is On The Sage", "Little Green Valley", "Down on the Old Plantation", "I'm Alone Because I Love You", "The Utah Trail", "Goin' Back to Texas", "Left My Gal in the Mountains", "In the Cumberland Mountains", "An Old Man's Story, "Little Cabin in the Cascade Mountains", and "The Birmingham Jail" sold a great many copies, and influenced future generations of country singers.

In his recordings for Victor Records, Luther also used the alias Bud Billings. The UK Zonophone label used these masters as well, with the Bud Billings name.

When Robison formed his own cowboy singing group for a British tour in 1932, Luther assembled a new trio with his wife and baritone Leonard Stokes. They recorded some sides for RCA Victor, but 75-cent country records were not selling very well in the Depression, which was just getting underway. Art Satherley, legendary producer for the American Record Corporation, began to record the Luther Trio on 25-cent chain store discs. Coincidental with their first ARC releases came the group's debut on the NBC radio series, Hillbilly Heart-throbs in 1933. Created and written by folklorist/writer/performer Ethel Park Richardson, the network series dramatized old Appalachian ballads as well as newer country music narrative songs. Well-known radio actors played the dramatic roles, with the musical bridges between scenes furnished by the Frank Luther Trio. Richardson, whom Luther would refer to forty years later as a "wonderful woman", introduced him to many mountain songs and influenced his repertoire. While on her show, Zora Layman became the first country female singer to have a major hit record with Bob Miller's "Seven Years With the Wrong Man". Her debut performance caused the NBC switchboard to light up for two hours. Luther scored hits with "Rocking Alone in An Old Rocking Chair", "When the White Azaleas Start Blooming", "The Old Spinning Wheel", "Home on the Range", "New Twenty-One Years", and "Seven Years With the Wrong Woman".

In 1940, Luther sang on I'll Never Forget, a radio program on the Mutual Broadcasting System.

=== Dance band vocalist ===
While Luther's role in the early development of country and western music is significant, he regularly performed many other types of music. From 1928 until the outbreak of World War II, he recorded hundreds of vocal choruses with popular dance bands of the day. The High Hatters, Victor Arden and Phil Ohman, Leo Reisman, Russell Wooding's Red Caps, Joe Venuti, and many other recording bands featured Luther's jazzy tenor vocals. He was also tenor with a number of pop trios and quartets, performing not only on records but on radio broadcasts, often as many as five different programs per day. He also made a series of movie shorts in New York, several of which were released by Educational Pictures. In 1936, he starred in his only full-length Hollywood feature, a story about radio entertainers called High Hat.

=== Children's music ===
Frank Luther's star on the Hollywood Walk of Fame represents what was to become his chief claim to fame. Early in his recording career, he made some 7-inch shellac records for children. Several sets were made for Victor in 1933. In 1934, however, Jack Kapp signed Luther to record for the new 35-cent blue label Decca company. He began by making a series of hillbilly records, but did two 78 rpm albums of songs for children a few months later. "Mother Goose Songs" and "Nursery Rhymes", the first two albums, featured Luther's tenor voice in brief interpretations of traditional children's tunes, tied together with gentle and pleasant narration. At one point in the Decca set, Luther introduced a lullaby by calmly saying, "Mother tucks you in, kisses you, and leaves you in the nice, friendly darkness. Mother's so wonderful, isn't she? Love her every day you live. She loves you so much." Two pediatricians told Luther that they had used his record to calm small children who feared being in the dark. Child psychologists began to endorse the Luther recordings. The first two albums sold in enormous quantities, and were pressed numerous times.

Luther's country music days came to a halt, and he did fewer dance band vocal choruses. He was now in demand as Decca's performer of children's songs and stories. Selling even better were his recordings of Winnie-the-Pooh Songs based on A.A. Milne's books for children, and Babar Songs and Stories based on Jean de Brunhoff's Babar the Elephant books. A Luther-composed Alice in Wonderland album, a true-to-the-original album of songs from Disney's Snow White and the Seven Dwarfs, Tuneful Tales, Manners Can Be Fun, Raggedy Ann Songs, and hundreds more established Luther as the dean of children's recordings. Decca claimed, in 1946, that 85% of the records for young people sold in the English-speaking world were Luther's.

=== Stephen Foster melodies ===
While his recordings for children remained his chief claim to fame, Luther made a number of successful 78 rpm album sets for Decca in the late 1930s and early 1940s. Focusing on Americana (he wrote a book, Americans and Their Songs, published in 1942), he made an album of Civil War songs entitled Songs of the North and the South in the War between the States (1861-1865) which he and Zora Layman sang with the Century Quartet, songs of early New York, songs of old California, Gay Nineties songs, Irish favorites, and rare Christmas carols. Many of these he and Zora Layman performed on their own radio series. Most widely acclaimed were two albums of compositions by Stephen Foster. Performed with a sensitivity and sentimentality stylistically consistent with the famous American composer's approach, Luther's renditions were active in the Decca catalogue for some fifteen years. His interpretations of such compositions as "Ah! May the Red Rose Live Alway", "The Hour For Thee and Me", "Beautiful Dreamer", "Sweetly She Sleeps, My Alice Fair", "My Old Kentucky Home" and "Comrades, Fill No Glass For Me" were acclaimed by music critics of the day.

=== After World War II ===
In 1946, Luther - by now a Decca Records executive, in charge of children's, educational, and religious recordings - returned to the studios to re-record many of his pre-war albums for children and to make many others, including "The Birthday Party Record", released on Decca in the fall of 1950. He had taken college-level courses in child psychology and was now busy as an educational lecturer, also doing hundreds of personal appearances in schools each year. Recording prolifically, his tenor voice began to mellow. By the early 1950s, he was singing baritone. Some years earlier, Luther and Zora Layman had divorced. He remarried and had two children, a daughter and son, in the late 1940s. Luther continued to record regularly for Decca through 1954.

While planning a record album based on Mark Twain's Tom Sawyer, Luther began writing songs based on the book and soon found that he had enough for a full-length play for adult audiences. The show he devised did not reach Broadway, but it was turned into a network television special on the U.S. Steel Hour in 1956. Decca released an original cast album that same year. The musical was subsequently performed around the country by little theatre groups and stock companies.

Luther continued to record, forming his own label and then working for a variety of educational record companies. He did a series for United Artists Records, some albums of songs adapted from the writings of various children's authors, and some narrations of children's books. These included Babar Songs and Stories, an LP of retellings of Jean de Brunhoff's Babar the Elephant series he recorded for Vocalion Records in the early 1960s. On this album he punctuated his narrations of The Story of Babar, The Travels of Babar, Babar the King, Babar and his Children, Zephir's Holiday and Babar and Father Christmas with snatches of song at various junctures in the stories.

Luther also produced albums by others. His best-known work as a producer was the million-selling original cast album of the Off-Broadway musical, The Fantasticks. Luther's "Happy the Harmonica" was covered by media satirists Negativland on their album Free. The recording was later included among Luther's production credits.

=== Final years ===
Luther's last two albums, made in stereo for Pickwick International, were nostalgic re-visits to two familiar themes, A Treasury of Mother Goose Songs and American Folk Songs. He did not retire, but continued to write scores and work on recording projects in the 1970s, one being a set of songs about protecting the environment.

== Death ==
Frank Luther died in New York City in 1980 at the age of 81.

== Discography ==
Frank Luther has been attributed to working on over 1000 recordings in varying roles such as songwriting, vocals, and yodeling. At times, he was known to play instruments like the ocarina, xylophone, and bells. Throughout his career he worked under various names such as Bud Billings, Fred Larabee, and Eddie Bell.

Title	Year	Performers	Frank Luther's Role	Company
Barnacle Bill, the Sailor	1930	Hoagy Carmichael Orchestra and Carson Robison	Songwriter	Victor
The Return of Barnacle Bill the Sailor	1930	Bobbie Comber	Songwriter	Vocalion Gramophone Co. Ltd.
Remember Pearl Harbor	1941	Carson Robinson	Songwriter	Bluebird

== See also ==
- Remember Pearl Harbor
