= Haddocks' Eyes =

Nickname of the name of a song

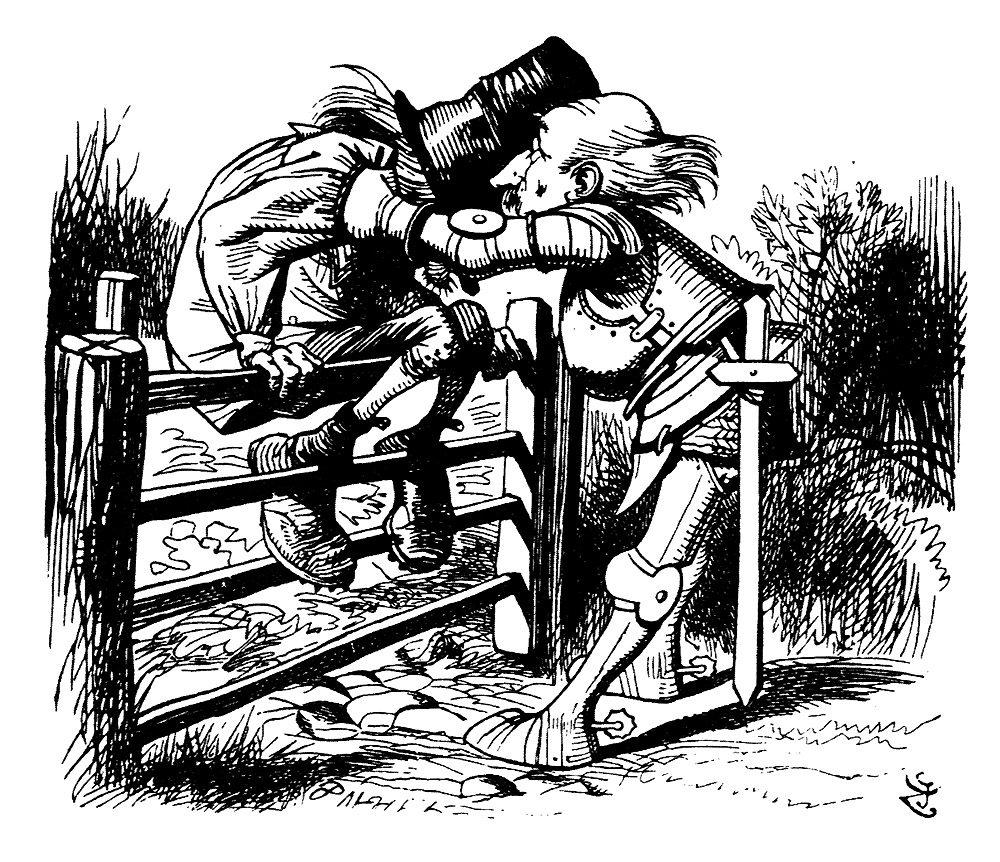
Illustration by John Tenniel

"Haddocks' Eyes" is the nickname of the name of a song sung by The White Knight from Lewis Carroll's 1871 novel Through the Looking-Glass, chapter VIII.

"Haddocks' Eyes" is an example used to elaborate on the symbolic status of the concept of "name": a name as identification marker may be assigned to anything, including another name, thus introducing different levels of symbolization. It has been discussed in several works on logic and philosophy.

== Haddocks' Eyes ==
The White Knight explains to Alice a confusing nomenclature for the song.

"You are sad," the Knight said in an anxious tone: "let me sing you a song to comfort you."
"Is it very long?" Alice asked, for she had heard a good deal of poetry that day.
"It's long," said the Knight, "but very, very beautiful. Everybody that hears me sing it—either it brings the tears into their eyes, or else—"
"Or else what?" said Alice, for the Knight had made a sudden pause.
"Or else it doesn't, you know. The name of the song is called 'Haddocks' Eyes'."
"Oh, that's the name of the song, is it?" Alice said, trying to feel interested.
"No, you don't understand," the Knight said, looking a little vexed.
"That's what the name is called. The name really is 'The Aged Aged Man'."
"Then I ought to have said 'That's what the song is called'?" Alice corrected herself.
"No, you oughtn't: that's quite another thing! The song is called 'Ways And Means': but that's only what it's called, you know!"
"Well, what is the song, then?" said Alice, who was by this time completely bewildered.
"I was coming to that," the Knight said. "The song really is 'A-sitting On A Gate': and the tune's my own invention."

To summarize:

- The song's name is called Haddocks' Eyes
- The song's name is The Aged Aged Man
- The song is called Ways and Means
- The song is A-sitting on a Gate

The complicated terminology distinguishing between 'the song, what the song is called, the name of the song, and what the name of the song is called' both uses and mentions the use–mention distinction.

== The song ==
The White Knight sings the song to a tune he claims as his own invention, but which Alice recognises as "I give thee all, I can no more". By the time Alice heard it, she was already tired of poetry.

The song parodies the plot, but not the style or metre, of "Resolution and Independence" by William Wordsworth.

I'll tell thee everything I can:
There's little to relate.
I saw an aged aged man,
A-sitting on a gate.
"Who are you, aged man?" I said,
"And how is it you live?"
And his answer trickled through my head,
Like water through a sieve.

He said "I look for butterflies
That sleep among the wheat:
I make them into mutton-pies,
And sell them in the street.
I sell them unto men," he said,
"Who sail on stormy seas;
And that's the way I get my bread—
A trifle, if you please."

But I was thinking of a plan
To dye one's whiskers green,
And always use so large a fan
That they could not be seen.
So, having no reply to give
To what the old man said,
I cried "Come, tell me how you live!"
And thumped him on the head.

His accents mild took up the tale:
He said "I go my ways,
And when I find a mountain-rill,
I set it in a blaze;
And thence they make a stuff they call
Rowlands' Macassar-Oil—
Yet twopence-halfpenny is all
They give me for my toil."

But I was thinking of a way
To feed oneself on batter,
And so go on from day to day
Getting a little fatter.
I shook him well from side to side,
Until his face was blue:
"Come, tell me how you live," I cried,
"And what it is you do!"

He said "I hunt for haddocks' eyes
Among the heather bright,
And work them into waistcoat-buttons
In the silent night.
And these I do not sell for gold
Or coin of silvery shine,
But for a copper halfpenny,
And that will purchase nine.

"I sometimes dig for buttered rolls,
Or set limed twigs for crabs:
I sometimes search the grassy knolls
For wheels of Hansom-cabs.
And that's the way" (he gave a wink)
"By which I get my wealth—
And very gladly will I drink
Your Honour's noble health."

I heard him then, for I had just
Completed my design
To keep the Menai bridge from rust
By boiling it in wine.
I thanked him much for telling me
The way he got his wealth,
But chiefly for his wish that he
Might drink my noble health.

And now, if e'er by chance I put
My fingers into glue,
Or madly squeeze a right-hand foot
Into a left-hand shoe,
Or if I drop upon my toe
A very heavy weight,
I weep, for it reminds me so
Of that old man I used to know—
Whose look was mild, whose speech was slow
Whose hair was whiter than the snow,
Whose face was very like a crow,
With eyes, like cinders, all aglow,
Who seemed distracted with his woe,
Who rocked his body to and fro,
And muttered mumblingly and low,
As if his mouth were full of dough,
Who snorted like a buffalo—
That summer evening long ago,
A-sitting on a gate.

== Upon the Lonely Moor ==
Like "Jabberwocky", another poem published in Through the Looking Glass, "Haddocks' Eyes" appears to have been revised over the course of many years. In 1856, Carroll published the following poem anonymously under the name Upon the Lonely Moor. It bears an obvious resemblance to "Haddocks' Eyes".

I met an aged, aged man
Upon the lonely moor:
I knew I was a gentleman,
And he was but a boor.
So I stopped and roughly questioned him,
"Come, tell me how you live!"
But his words impressed my ear no more
Than if it were a sieve.

He said, "I look for soap-bubbles,
That lie among the wheat,
And bake them into mutton-pies,
And sell them in the street.
I sell them unto men," he said,
"Who sail on stormy seas;
And that's the way I get my bread –
A trifle, if you please."

But I was thinking of a way
To multiply by ten,
And always, in the answer, get
The question back again.
I did not hear a word he said,
But kicked that old man calm,
And said, "Come, tell me how you live!"
And pinched him in the arm.

His accents mild took up the tale:
He said, "I go my ways,
And when I find a mountain-rill,
I set it in a blaze.
And thence they make a stuff they call
Rowland's Macassar Oil;
But fourpence-halfpenny is all
They give me for my toil."

But I was thinking of a plan
To paint one's gaiters green,
So much the color of the grass
That they could ne'er be seen.
I gave his ear a sudden box,
And questioned him again,
And tweaked his grey and reverend locks,
And put him into pain.

He said, "I hunt for haddock's eyes
Among the heather bright,
And work them into waistcoat-buttons
In the silent night.
And these I do not sell for gold,
Or coin or silver-mine,
But for a copper-halfpenny,
And that will purchase nine.

"I sometimes dig for buttered rolls,
Or set limed twigs for crabs;
I sometimes search the flowery knolls
For wheels of hansom cabs.
And that's the way" (he gave a wink)
"I get my living here,
And very gladly will I drink
Your Honour's health in beer."

I heard him then, for I had just
Completed my design
To keep the Menai bridge from rust
By boiling it in wine.
I duly thanked him, ere I went,
For all his stories queer,
But chiefly for his kind intent
To drink my health in beer.

And now if e'er by chance I put
My fingers into glue,
Or madly squeeze a right-hand foot
Into a left-hand shoe;
Or if a statement I aver
Of which I am not sure,
I think of that strange wanderer
Upon the lonely moor.

== See also ==
- Nonsense verse
