= My Heart and Lute =

Song/poem by Thomas Moore

"My Heart and Lute", sometimes known by its first line, "I give thee all, I can no more", is a song/poem by Thomas Moore.

In Through the Looking-Glass by Lewis Carroll, Alice recognizes the tune used in the song called Ways and Means sung by the White Knight.

== The poem ==
I give thee all—I can no more
Though poor the off'ring be;
My heart and lute are all the store
That I can bring to thee.
A lute whose gentle song reveals
the soul of love full well;
And, better far, a heart that feels
Much more than lute could tell.

Though love and song may fail, alas!
To keep life's clouds away,
At least 'twill make them lighter pass
Or gild them if they stay.
And ev'n if care, at moments, flings
A discord o'er life's happy strain,
Let love but gently touch the strings,
'Twill all be sweet again!
