= Southern Railway 1102 =

American Baldwin Class F-14 4-6-0 Ten Wheeler Type steam locomotive

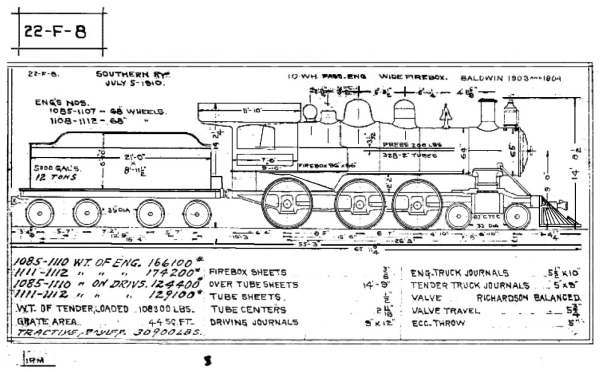
- The blueprint of a different locomotive, the F-8.
Type and origin
- Power type: Steam
- Builder: Baldwin Locomotive Works
- Serial number: 22633
- Model: 10-36-D
- Build date: 1903
Specifications
- Configuration
  - Whyte: 4-6-0
- Gauge: 4 ft 8 1/2 in (1,435 mm)
- Leading dia.: 33 in (83.8 cm)
- Driver dia.: 68 in (172.7 cm)
- Height: 14 ft 8 1/2 in (4.483 m)
- Adhesive weight: 124,420 pounds (56,440 kg)
- Loco weight: 166,060 pounds (75,320 kg)
- Tender weight: 108,300 pounds (49,100 kg)
- Total weight: 274,360 pounds (124,450 kg)
- Fuel type: Coal
- Fuel capacity: 12 short tons (10.9 t; 10.7 long tons)
- Water cap.: 5,000 US gal (19,000 L; 4,200 imp gal)
- Firebox
  - Grate area: 2,654.8 sq ft (246.64 m^{2})
- Boiler
  - Tube plates: 14 ft 9 in (4.50 m)
- Boiler pressure: 200 psi (1,400 kPa)
- Cylinder size: 21 in × 28 in (530 mm × 710 mm)
- Valve gear: Walschaerts
- Valve type: Richardson Balanced
- Valve travel: 5 3/4 in (150 mm)
Performance figures
- Tractive effort: 30,900 pounds (14,000 kg)
Career
- Operators: Southern Railway
- Class: F-14
- Numbers: 1102
- Nicknames: Old 97
- Locale: Southern United States
- Delivered: August 21, 1903
- First run: 1903
- Last run: 1935
- Scrapped: July 9, 1935

Southern Railway No. 1102 was a 4-6-0 Baldwin F-14 class steam locomotive built in 1903 by Baldwin Locomotive Works for Southern Railway. It was used on the Fast Mail passenger trains between Washington, D.C., and Atlanta, Georgia. The locomotive gained notoriety for being involved in the derailment of September 27, 1903, that served as the inspiration for the ballad Wreck of the Old 97. Upon being rebuilt, the locomotive continued its career on the Southern pulling passenger trains and freight trains for more than thirty years, until it was retired and scrapped on July 9, 1935, at the Southern Railway's Princeton Shops in Princeton, Indiana.
