= Life Gets Tee-Jus Don't It =

"Life Gits Tee-Jus Don't It"

Single by Carson Robison
- Released: 1948
- Genre: Country
- Length: 2:57
- Label: M-G-M
- Songwriter: Carson Robison

"Life Gits Tee-Jus Don't It" is a country music song/spoken word recital that was written and sung/spoken by Carson Robison (backed by The Pleasant Valley Boys) and released on the M-G-M label (catalog no. 10224-A). In August 1948, it reached No. 3 on the Billboard folk best seller and juke box charts. It was also ranked as the No. 7 record on Billboard's 1948 year-end folk record sellers chart.
