= Wreck of the Old 97 =

1903 Southern Railway mail train disaster

Coordinates: 36.595928°N 79.394007°W

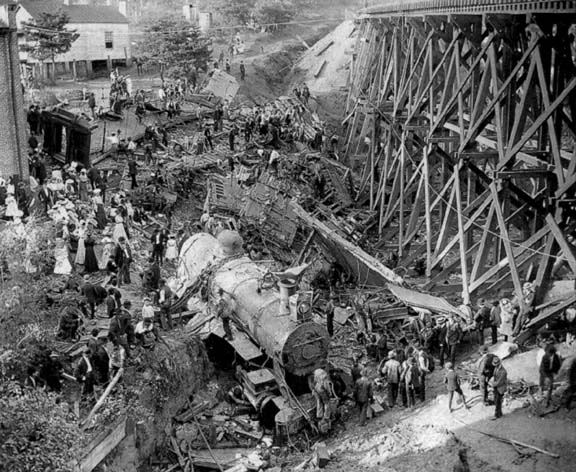
- The Wreck of Old 97 at Stillhouse Trestle near Danville, Virginia, 1903. The photograph is believed to have been taken a few days after the occurrence of the wreck as the locomotive, Southern Railway 1102, which had overturned, has been righted.

Details
- Date: September 27, 1903; 122 years ago
- Location: Stillhouse Trestle, Danville, Virginia, U.S.
- Country: United States
- Line: Southern Railway
- Incident type: Derailment
- Cause: Excessive speed

Statistics
- Deaths: 11
- Injured: 7

The Wreck of the Old 97 was an American rail disaster involving the Southern Railway mail train, officially known as the Fast Mail (train number 97), while en route from Monroe, Virginia, to Spencer, North Carolina, on September 27, 1903. Travelling at an excessive speed in an attempt to maintain schedule, the train derailed at the Stillhouse Trestle near Danville, Virginia, where it careened off the side of the bridge, killing 11 on-board personnel and injuring seven others. The wreck inspired a famous railroad ballad, which was the focus of a copyright lawsuit and became seminal in the genre of country music.

== Wreck ==
The wreck of Old 97, known as the Fast Mail, occurred when the engineer, 33-year-old Joseph Andrew ("Steve") Broady at the controls of Southern Railway 1102, was operating the train at high speed in order to stay on schedule and arrive at Spencer on time. The Fast Mail had a reputation for never being late. Steam locomotive No. 1102, a ten-wheeler 4-6-0 built by Baldwin Locomotive Works in Philadelphia, had rolled out of the factory in early 1903, less than a year before the wreck.

On the day of the accident, the Fast Mail was behind schedule when it left Washington, D.C., and was one hour late when it arrived in Monroe, Virginia. When the train arrived in Monroe its crew was switched, and when it left Monroe, there were 17 people on board. The train personnel included Broady, conductor John Blair, fireman A.C. Clapp, student fireman John Hodge (sometimes known as Dodge in other documents), and flagman James Robert Moody. Also aboard were various mail clerks including J.L. Thompson, Scott Chambers, Daniel Flory, Paul Argenbright, Lewis Spies, Frank Brooks, Percival Indermauer, Charles Reams, Jennings Dunlap, M. C. Maupin, J. H. Thompson, and W. R. Pinckney, an express messenger. When the train pulled into Lynchburg, Wentworth Armistead, a safe locker, boarded the train, bringing the number of on-board personnel to 18. (A safe locker is a railroad employee entrusted with the combination to a train's safe.)

At Monroe, Broady was instructed to get the Fast Mail to Spencer, 166 miles (267 km) distant, making up whatever lost time he could over the division. The scheduled running time from Monroe to Spencer was four hours, fifteen minutes – an average speed of approximately 39 mph (63 km/h). In order to make up the one hour delay, the train's average speed would have to be at least 51 mph (82 km/h). Broady was ordered to maintain speed through Franklin Junction in Gretna, an intermediate stop normally made during the run.

The route between Monroe and Spencer ran through rolling terrain, and there were numerous danger points due to the combination of grades and tight radius curves. Signs were posted to warn engineers to watch their speed. However, in his quest to stay on time, Broady rapidly descended a heavy grade that ended at the 45-foot-high (14 m) Stillhouse Trestle, which spanned Stillhouse Branch. He was unable to sufficiently reduce speed as he approached the curve leading into the trestle, causing the entire train to derail and plunge into the ravine below. The flames that erupted afterwards consumed the splintered debris of the wooden cars, and it was very hard for the local fire department to extinguish the blaze. The investigation that followed was greatly hampered by the fire and the few witnesses to the incident.

Of the eighteen men on board, eleven men died (nine on impact) and seven were injured. Among the deceased were the conductor Blair, engineer Broady and flagman Moody. The bodies of both firemen were recovered, but they were mangled so badly they were unrecognizable.

Several survivors of the wreck believed they stayed alive because they jumped from the train just before the fatal plunge. Among the survivors were mail clerks Thompson and Harris. Pinckney, the express messenger, also survived the wreck, went home to Charlotte, North Carolina, and immediately resigned after his life-changing experience. Two other survivors, Jennings J. Dunlap and M.C. Maupin, did not resign, although they transferred to new departments. Dunlap went to work on a train that ran between Washington and Charlotte (the Southern Railway line from Monroe to Spencer was then and remains today a segment of the (now Norfolk Southern) line Washington and Charlotte), while Maupin worked at the Charlotte Union station.

Only a fraction of the mail had survived, including a large case filled with canaries that managed to escape and fly to safety. Engine 1102 was recovered and repaired, and it went on to perform further duties until it was dismantled in July 1935.

The day after the wreck, vice-president Finley made a speech in which he said: "The train consisted of two postal cars, one express and one baggage car for the storage of mail.... Eyewitnesses said the train was approaching the trestle at speeds of 30 to 35 miles (48 to 56 km) an hour." The Southern Railway placed blame for the wreck on Broady, disavowing that he had been ordered to run as fast as possible to maintain the schedule. The railroad also claimed he descended the grade leading to the trestle at a speed of more than 70 mph (110 km/h). Several eyewitnesses to the wreck, however, stated that the speed was probably around 50 mph (80 km/h). In all likelihood, the railroad was at least partially to blame, as it had a lucrative contract with the U.S. Post Office to haul mail, and the contract included a penalty clause for each minute the train was late into Atlanta. It is probably safe to conclude that the engineers piloting the Fast Mail were always under pressure to stay on time so that the railroad would not be penalized for late mail delivery.

The Fast Mail was in another fatal accident earlier in the year of 1903. On Monday, April 13, the train left Washington at 8:00 am, en route to New Orleans. As the train approached Lexington, North Carolina, it collided with a boulder on the track, causing the train to derail and ditch, killing the engineer and fireman. The locomotive pulling the train, as shown in the photo above, was Southern Railway 1102, a 4-6-0 F-14 class built by Baldwin Locomotive Works in 1903. Upon being rebuilt, the locomotive continued its career on the Southern pulling passenger trains and freight trains for more than thirty years, until it was retired and scrapped on July 9, 1935, at the Southern Railway's Princeton Shops in Princeton, Indiana .

== Ballad ==
"Wreck of the Old 97"

Song by G. B. Grayson, Henry Whitter
- Written: Unknown
- Songwriters: G. B. Grayson, Henry Whitter

The disaster inspired several songs, the most famous being the ballad first recorded commercially by Virginia musicians G. B. Grayson and Henry Whitter. Vernon Dalhart's version was released in 1924 (Victor Record no. 19427), sometimes cited as the first million-selling country music release in the American record industry, with Carson Robison playing guitar and Dalhart playing harmonica. Since then, "Wreck of the Old 97" has been recorded by numerous artists, including Dalhart himself in 1924 under the name Sid Turner on Perfect 12147, The Statler Brothers (feat. Johnny Cash), Charlie Louvin of The Louvin Brothers, Flatt and Scruggs, Woody Guthrie, Pete Seeger, Johnny Cash, Hank Snow, Hank Williams III, Patrick Sky, Nine Pound Hammer, Roy Acuff, Boxcar Willie, Lonnie Donegan, The Seekers, Ernest Stoneman & Kahle Brewer, Carolyn Hester, Hank Thompson, John Mellencamp, Pink Anderson, Lowgold, Chuck Ragan, and David Holt. In 2026 the band Old 97s, named after the wreck and the Ballad, recorded their version of this age old piece of Americana. The music was often accompanied by a banjo and a fiddle, while the lyrics were either sung, crooned, yodeled, whistled, hummed, recited, or chanted. The song rivaled that of "Casey Jones" for being the number one railroading song of all time. The actress Ann Dvorak sings two verses of the ballad in the 1932 movie Scarface.

The ballad was sung to the tune of "The Ship That Never Returned", written by Henry Clay Work in 1865. Originally, the lyrics were attributed to Fred Jackson Lewey and co-author Charles Weston Noell. Lewey claimed to have written the song the day after the accident, in which his cousin Albion Clapp was one of the two firemen killed. Lewey worked in a cotton mill that was at the base of the trestle, and also claimed to be on the scene of the accident pulling the victims from the wreckage. Musician Henry Whitter subsequently polished the original, altering the lyrics, resulting in the version performed by Dalhart.

In 1927 it was claimed that the author of "Wreck of the Old 97" was local resident David Graves George, who was one of the first on the scene. George was a brakeman and telegraph operator who also happened to be a singer. Witnessing the tragedy inspired him to write the ballad. After the 1924 recording by the Victor Talking Machine Company was released, George filed a claim for ownership. On March 11, 1933, Judge John Boyd proclaimed that George was the author of the ballad. Victor Talking Machine Company was forced to pay David $65,000 of the profits from about five million records sold. Victor appealed three times. The first two times, the courts ruled in favor of George. The third time the court of appeals ruled in favor of Victor Talking Machines. George appealed to the Supreme Court of the United States, but the court ruled that George had filed his appeal too late and dismissed it, thereby granting Victor ownership of the ballad.

"Wreck of the Old 97" is 777 in the Roud Folk Song Index.

The ballad clearly places the blame for the wreck on the railroad company for pressuring Steve Broady to exceed a safe speed limit, for the lyric (on the Dalhart recording) begins, "Well, they handed him his orders in Monroe, Virginia, saying, 'Steve, you're way behind time; this is not 38 it is Old 97, you must put her into Spencer on time.'"

== See also ==
- List of train songs
- Old 97's, a band named after the ballad
