= Carson Robison =

American singer-songwriter (1890–1957)

Carson Jay Robison
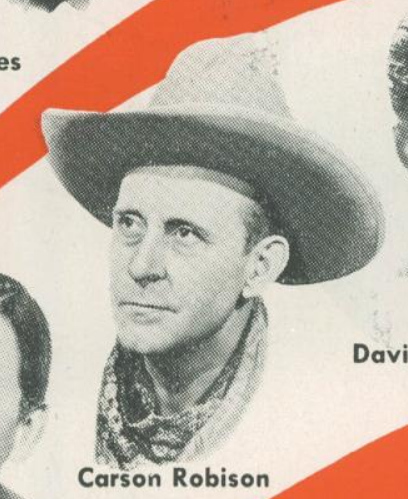

Background information
- Also known as: Charles Robison
- Born: Carson Jay Robison; August 4, 1890; Oswego, Kansas, US
- Origin: New York City
- Died: March 24, 1957 (aged 66) Poughkeepsie, New York, US
- Genres: Country music
- Occupations: Musician, singer-songwriter, actor
- Instruments: Acoustic guitar, vocals, harmonica, whistling
- Years active: 1924–1957

Carson Jay Robison (August 4, 1890 – March 24, 1957) was an American country music singer and songwriter. He was a recording artist from the mid-1920s until his death in 1957. He was also known as Charles Robison and used the pseudonym Carlos B. McAfee for some of his compositions.

== Early life ==
Carson Jay Robison was born in Oswego, Kansas, and raised in nearby Chetopa, Kansas. His father was a champion fiddler; his mother played the piano and sang. Robison grew up on a farm, and was a cowpuncher.

Robison became a professional musician in the American Midwest at the age of 14, most notably as a backing musician for Victor Records's Wendell Hall on the early 1920s music hall circuit. He worked as a singer and whistler at radio station WDAF (Kansas City, Missouri).

== Recording career ==
In 1924, he moved to New York City and was signed to his first recording contract with the Victor Talking Machine Company. Also that year, Robison started a professional collaboration with Vernon Dalhart, one of the era's most notable singers. Through this relationship, Robison had success, mainly as a songwriter but also as a musician, accompanying Dalhart on guitar, harmonica, whistling, and harmony vocals. In one of their first collaborations, Robison accompanied Dalhart on the landmark recording of "Wreck of the Old 97" b/w "The Prisoner's Song" (1924), widely regarded as country music's first million-seller. During this period, Robison also became a successful composer of "event" songs, which recounted current events or tragedies in a predictable fashion, usually concluding in a moral lesson. Some popular examples of his topical compositions include "The Wreck of the Shenandoah", Remember Pearl Harbor, "The Wreck of the Number Nine", and "The John T. Scopes Trial", about the Scopes Monkey Trial.

Between 1927 and 1929 he also recorded with the Vernon Dalhart Trio, composed of Robison, Vernon Dalhart, and Adelyne Hood.

In 1928, after Dalhart made a personnel change without consulting Robison, their relationship ended. Although the break up did not prove lucrative for either artist, Robison continued to record for decades to come. From 1928 to 1931 he teamed with Frank Luther, recording songs for various labels and appearing on WOR radio in New York City. In 1932, he started his own band, Carson Robison's Pioneers (later renamed The Buckaroos), and continued touring and recording through the 1930s and 1940s. It was during this period that Robison made some of the earliest tours of a country musician in Great Britain, appearing there in 1932, 1936, and 1938. According to Billboard, his 1942 reworking of the standard "Turkey in the Straw", with new lyrics relating to World War II, was that year's most popular song. In the late 1940s and early 1950s, he appeared on the Grand Ole Opry. His most famous recording was 1948's "Life Gets Tee-Jus Don't It", a worldwide hit for MGM Records.

Although he played country music for most of his career, he is also remembered for writing expurgated lyrics for "Barnacle Bill the Sailor" with music by Frank Luther. Also, in 1956, he wrote and recorded the novelty rock and roll song, "Rockin' and Rollin' With Grandmaw."

== Personal life ==
Robison was married twice. His first wife was Rebecca. They had a son, Carson Donald Robison. Donald was raised by his grandmother after the untimely death of Rebecca from tuberculosis in her early 20s. Eventually, both father and son settled in Pleasant Valley, New York. Donald had followed his father to this area to be close to New York City for his own career. During this time, Robison caught the eye of a young secretary working at the record label he was under contract to, Catherine "Catty". Carson and Catty were married and had three children, Patricia, Robert, and Kenneth.

== Death and legacy ==
Robison died in 1957 in Poughkeepsie, New York.

== Publications ==
- Carson J. Robison's World's Greatest Collection Of Mountain Ballads And Old Time Songs, 64 pages, 50 songs, with copyright 1930 was published by M.M. Cole Publishing House of Chicago.
- The Newest Carson Robison Book of 25 Songs "and just a poem or two". Copyright 1936 by Carson J Robison. 56 pages.

== Albums ==
- 1955 – Square Dances
- 1958 – Life Gets Tee-Jus, Don't It
- 1978 – Immortal Carson Robison
- 1981 – Just a Melody
- 1987 – The Kansas Jayhawk
- 1988 – A Hillbilly Mixture
- 1996 – Home, Sweet Home on the Prairie: 25 Cowboy Classics
- 1996 – Home, Sweet Home on the Prairie
- 2002 – A Real Hillbilly Legend
- 2005 – Going Back to Texas

== Songs ==
- "Turkey in the Straw" (1942)
- "Texas Dan"
- "The Little Green Valley"
- "Left My Gal in the Mountains"
- "Sleepy Rio Grande"
- "Goin' Back to Texas"
- "Utah Trail"
- "Red River Valley"
- "Carry Me Back to the Lone Prairie"
- "Remember Pearl Harbor" (1941)
- "We're Gonna Have To Slap the Dirty Little Jap (and Uncle Sam's The Guy Who Can Do It)"
- "The Runaway Train"
- "The Denver Dragon"
- "Sittin' By the Fire"
- "Life Gets Tee-Jus Don't It"
- "The Wreck of the Number Nine"
- "The Wreck of the Shenandoah"
- "I'm No Communist"
- "I'm goin' back to whur I come from"
- "Will Someone Please Tell Me Who to Vote For"
- "Lonely Hobo"

== See also ==
- Grand Ole Opry
- List of country music performers
- Inductees of the Country Music Hall of Fame
