= Through the Looking-Glass =

1871 children's novel by Lewis Carroll

Through the Looking-Glass, and What Alice Found There
- Alice passes through the looking-glass and out the other side
- Author: Lewis Carroll
- Illustrator: John Tenniel
- Language: English
- Genre: Children's fiction Portal fantasy Literary nonsense
- Publisher: Macmillan & Co
- Publication date: December 1871; 154 years ago
- Publication place: London
- Media type: Print (hardcover)
- Preceded by: Alice's Adventures in Wonderland
- Text: Through the Looking-Glass, and What Alice Found There at Wikisource

Through the Looking-Glass, and What Alice Found There is a novel published in December 1871 by Lewis Carroll, the pen name of Charles Lutwidge Dodgson, a mathematics lecturer at Christ Church, Oxford. It is the sequel to his Alice's Adventures in Wonderland (1865), in which many of the characters were anthropomorphic playing cards. In this second novel the theme is chess. As in the earlier book, the central figure, Alice, enters a fantastical world, this time by climbing through a large looking-glass (a mirror) (Note: In Carroll's day and well into the twentieth century "looking-glass" was the normal form; "mirror" was regarded as a genteelism, according to Modern English Usage. In upper-class usage this distinction continued into the 1950s, and the Oxford English Dictionary records "looking-glass" in use as recently as 2011.) into a world that she can see beyond it. There she finds that, just as in a reflection, things are reversed, including logic (for example, running helps one remain stationary, walking away from something brings one towards it, chessmen are alive and nursery-rhyme characters are real).

Among the characters Alice meets are the severe Red Queen, (Note: Regardless of the colour of the physical pieces, the two sides in chess are traditionally called Black and White, but ivory or bone chess sets of the Victorian era frequently had red and white chessmen.) the gentle and flustered White Queen, the quarrelsome twins Tweedledum and Tweedledee, the rude and opinionated Humpty Dumpty, and the kindly but impractical White Knight. Eventually, as in the earlier book, after a succession of strange adventures, Alice wakes and realises she has been dreaming. As in Alice's Adventures in Wonderland, the original illustrations are by John Tenniel.

The book contains several verse passages, including "Jabberwocky", "The Walrus and the Carpenter" and the White Knight's ballad, "A-sitting on a Gate". Like Alice's Adventures in Wonderland, the book introduces phrases that have become common currency, including "jam to-morrow and jam yesterday – but never jam to-day", "sometimes I've believed as many as six impossible things before breakfast", "un-birthday presents", "portmanteau words" and "as large as life and twice as natural".

Through the Looking Glass has been adapted for the stage and the screen and translated into many languages. Critical opinion of the book has generally been favourable and either ranked it on a par with its predecessor or else only just short of it.

== Background and first publication ==
Carroll, 1863 photograph

Although by 1871 Lewis Carroll had published several books and papers under his real name – Charles Lutwidge Dodgson – they had all been scholarly works about mathematics, on which he lectured at the University of Oxford. (Note: Examples include A Syllabus of Plane Algebraical Geometry (1860) and The Formulæ of Plane Trigonometry (1861).) Under his pseudonym he had published Alice's Adventures in Wonderland (1865), the work for which he was known to the wider public. That book was greatly different from much Victorian literature for children, which was frequently didactic and moralistic, sometimes displaying religious fervour and emphasising human sinfulness. The Oxford Companion to English Literature describes Carroll's book as "a landmark 'nonsense' text, liberating children from didactic fiction". A reviewer at the time of publication commented that the book "has no moral, and does not teach anything. It is without any of that bitter foundation which some people imagine ought to be at the bottom of all children's books". Another wrote, "If there be such a thing as perfection in children's tales, we should be tempted to say that Mr Carroll had reached it". The book sold in large numbers, and within a year of its publication Carroll was contemplating a sequel.

Alice's Adventures in Wonderland had grown from stories Carroll improvised for Alice Liddell and her sisters, the daughters of his Oxford neighbours Henry and Lorina Liddell. The proposed sequel had fewer such sources to draw on and was planned from the outset for publication. When Lorina Liddell became pregnant again the three children were sent to stay with their maternal grandmother at her house, Hetton Lawn, in Charlton Kings, near Cheltenham, where Carroll visited them. Above the drawing-room fireplace there was an enormous looking-glass (in more modern terms, a mirror). Carroll's biographer Morton N. Cohen suggests that it may have inspired the idea of climbing up to the chimney-piece and going through to the other side of the looking-glass. This was not confirmed by Carroll and nor was an alternative account stating that the looking-glass theme was suggested by another Alice – Carroll's cousin Alice Raikes – who recalled being in his company as a child and standing in front of a long mirror, holding an orange in her right hand. Carroll asked her in which hand the little girl in the mirror held it, and she replied, "The left hand ... but if I was on the other side of the glass, wouldn't the orange still be in my right?" (Note: Some biographers accept Raikes's suggestion that the exchange was seminal to the plot of Through the Looking-Glass, but Anne Clark Amor in her 1979 life of Carroll comments that the account dates from sixty years after the book was published, and Raikes's first encounter with Carroll took place when the text was well under way.)

In August 1866 Carroll wrote to his publisher, Alexander MacMillan, "It will probably be some time before I again indulge in paper and print. I have, however, a floating idea of writing a sort of sequel to Alice". He developed the idea, working slowly and intermittently; in February 1867 he told Macmillan, "I am hoping before long to complete another book about Alice. ... You would not, I presume, object to publish the book, if it should ever reach completion". In January 1869 he sent Macmillan the first completed chapter of the new book, tentatively titled Behind the Looking-Glass, and then spent a further year finishing the rest. The title of the book caused him some difficulty. He considered calling it Looking-Glass World, but Macmillan was unenthusiastic. At the suggestion of an Oxford colleague, Henry Liddon, Carroll adopted the title Through the Looking-Glass.

=== Illustrations ===
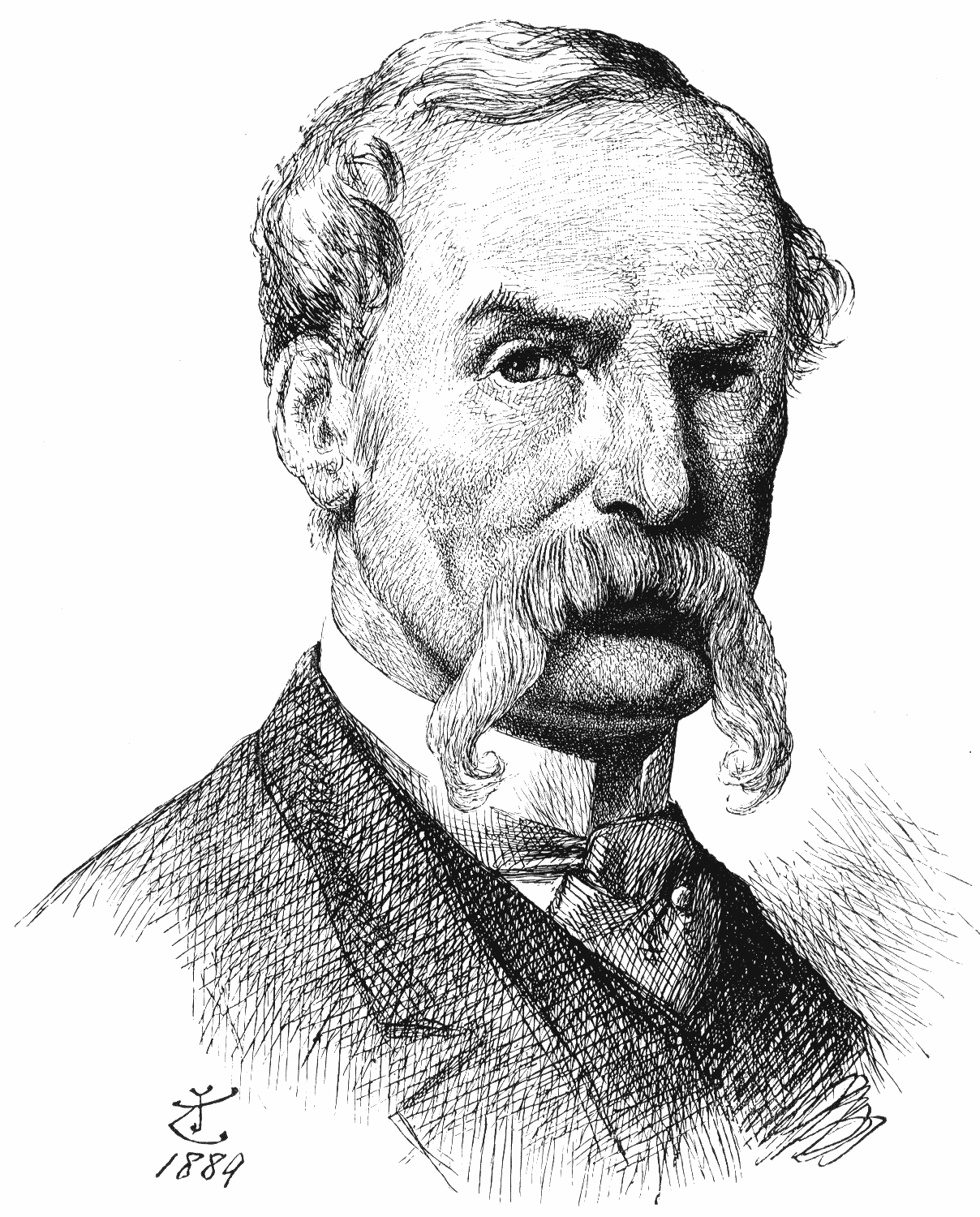
John Tenniel: self-portrait

Carroll had great difficulty in finding an illustrator for the book. He first approached John Tenniel, whose drawings for Alice's Adventures in Wonderland had been well received: The Pall Mall Gazette said, "The illustrations by Mr Tenniel are beyond praise. His rabbit, his puppy, his mad hatter are things not to be forgotten". The collaboration had not been smooth: Carroll was a perfectionist and insisted on minutely controlling all aspects of the production of his books. His publishers, Macmillan & Co, arranged for printing and distribution (for a ten per cent commission), but Carroll paid all the costs – printing, illustration and advertising – and made all the decisions. Tenniel was not enthusiastic about working with Carroll again; he said he was too busy as chief cartoonist for Punch and declined the commission. (Note: From its early days in the 1840s, Punch had been an important and influential weekly magazine. By Tenniel's time its influence had declined, but only slightly. As chief cartoonist of Punch, Tenniel was responsible for the "Big Cuts", the whole-page cartoons that were, according to a 1998 study, "the most important critique of national events in the national press".) He suggested one of his predecessors at Punch, Richard Doyle, but Carroll thought him "no longer good enough". Other artists considered but rejected were Arthur Hughes and W. S. Gilbert. (Note: As well as being an author, Gilbert illustrated his own verses in the magazine Fun. Carroll's biographer Michael Bakewell comments that it was fortunate that Carroll did not pursue that option: "the prospect of a collaboration between the irascible Gilbert and the inflexible Dodgson is too horrific to contemplate".) Macmillan suggested Noel Paton, who had drawn the frontispiece for The Water-Babies, but he declined because of pressure of other work. Eventually Carroll made a second approach to Tenniel, who reluctantly agreed to provide the illustrations for the new book, but only at his own pace. Carroll noted in his diary, "He thinks it possible (but not likely) that we might get it out by Christmas 1869".

=== The Wasp in a Wig ===
While the book was at proof stage Carroll made a substantial cut of about 1,400 words. The omitted section introduced a wasp wearing a yellow wig and includes a complete five-stanza poem that Carroll did not reuse elsewhere. If included in the book it would have followed, or been included at the end of, Chapter Eight – the chapter featuring the encounter with the White Knight. Tenniel wrote to Carroll:

Don't think me brutal, but I am bound to say that the 'wasp' chapter doesn't interest me in the least, & I can't see my way to a picture. If you wish to shorten the book, I can't help thinking – with all submission – that there is your opportunity.

The author cut the section. The manuscript has never been found and scholars searched unsuccessfully for years for traces of the missing material. Doubts arose whether it had ever existed, but in 1974 the London auction house Sotheby's offered for sale a batch of galley proofs with handwritten revisions and a note directing the printer to take the section out of the book. (Note: The proofs were bought by a Manhattan book dealer, for a bid of £1,700 (about £22,300 in 2024 terms), on behalf of a client, who gave the Carroll scholar Martin Gardner a copy with permission to publish it. Gardner included the text in his 1990 More Annotated Alice, and Macmillan & Co appended it in the centenary one-volume edition of the Alice books in 1998.) The chapter was first published in 1977 in a 37-page book by the Carroll scholar Martin Gardner, issued in New York by the Lewis Carroll Society of North America and in London by Macmillan & Co. It was reproduced in full by the British newspaper The Sunday Telegraph that September, with notes by Cohen. Although Tenniel had told Carroll that "a wasp in a wig is altogether beyond the appliances of art", the text printed by The Sunday Telegraph was accompanied by illustrations specially drawn or painted by Ralph Steadman, Sir Hugh Casson, Peter Blake and Patrick Procktor.

=== Publication ===
On 4 January 1871 Carroll finished the text, and later that month wrote that the second Alice book "has cost me, I think, more trouble than the first, and ought to be equal to it in every way". Tenniel had yet to produce nearly half the pictures. By the end of the year the book was ready for press. The title page carries the publication date 1872, but Through the Looking-Glass was on sale in time for Christmas 1871. Within weeks 15,000 copies had been sold. The first American edition was issued by Lee and Sheppard of Boston and New York in 1872.

== Characters ==
At the start of the book, Carroll includes a list of "Dramatis Personae as arranged before commencement of game". He then gives notes to the chess game the characters play out in the story. (Note: See § Chess below.)

Looking-glass countryside laid out like a chessboard (Note: This and all the other line drawings from the book in this article are by Tenniel.)

White Pieces (Note: According to the Oxford English Dictionary all the figures used in a game of chess may be called "pieces" but the term is particularly used for "any of the more valuable figures, such as the king, queen, etc., as distinct from the pawns".)	White Pawns	Red Pawns	Red Pieces
Tweedledee	Daisy	Daisy	Humpty Dumpty
Unicorn	Haigha	Messenger	Carpenter
Sheep	Oyster	Oyster	Walrus
White Queen	Lily	Tiger-lily	Red Queen
White King	Fawn	Rose	Red King
Aged man	Oyster	Oyster	Crow
White Knight	Hatta	Frog	Red Knight
Tweedledum	Daisy	Daisy	Lion

For other characters, see List of minor characters in Through the Looking-Glass.

== Plot ==
Alice progresses across a chessboard-like landscape in which the squares are separated by small brooks. Each time she steps across a brook to a new square in Chapters Three to Nine she finds herself meeting new characters in a self-contained story.

Alice lifts the White King from the floor to the table

=== Chapter One. Looking-Glass House ===
On a snowy November night Alice is sitting in an armchair before the fireplace, playing with a white kitten ("Snowdrop") and a black kitten ("Kitty"). She talks to Kitty about the game of chess and then speculates what the world is like on the other side of a mirror. Climbing up to the chimney piece, she touches the looking-glass above the fireplace and discovers, to her surprise, that she can step through it: "In another moment Alice was through the glass, and had jumped lightly down into the Looking-glass room". She finds herself in a reflected version of her own home and notices a book with looking-glass poetry, "Jabberwocky", whose reversed printing she can read only by holding it up to the mirror. In this room her chess pieces have come to life, although they remain small enough for her to pick up.

=== Chapter Two. The Garden of Live Flowers ===
On leaving the house Alice enters a sunny spring garden where the flowers can speak. Some of them are quite rude to her. Elsewhere in the garden, she meets the Red Queen, who is now human-sized, and who impresses Alice with her ability to run at breathtaking speeds.

The Red Queen explains that the entire countryside is laid out in squares, like a gigantic chessboard, and says that Alice will be a queen if she can advance all the way to the eighth rank on the board. (Note: Pawns that reach the last row are promoted to Queen (or other piece of the player's choice).) Because the White Queen's pawn, Lily, is too young to play, Alice is placed in the second rank in her stead. The Red Queen leaves her with the advice, "Speak in French when you can't think of the English for a thing – turn out your toes when you walk – and remember who you are!"

=== Chapter Three. Looking-Glass Insects ===
Alice finds herself as a passenger on a train that jumps over the third row directly into the fourth. (Note: Pawns can advance two spaces on their first move.) She arrives in a forest where a gnat teaches her about looking glass insects such as the "Bread-and-butterfly" and "Rocking-horsefly". It then vanishes.

Alice crosses the "wood where things have no names". There she cannot follow the Red Queen's advice – "remember who you are" – and forgets her own name. Together with a fawn, who has also forgotten who or what he is, she makes her way to the other side, where they both remember everything. The fawn bounds away.

=== Chapter Four. Tweedledum and Tweedledee ===
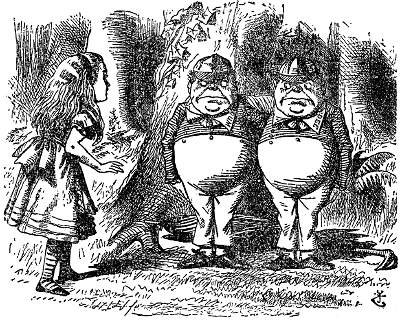
Alice meeting Tweedledum (centre) and Tweedledee (right)

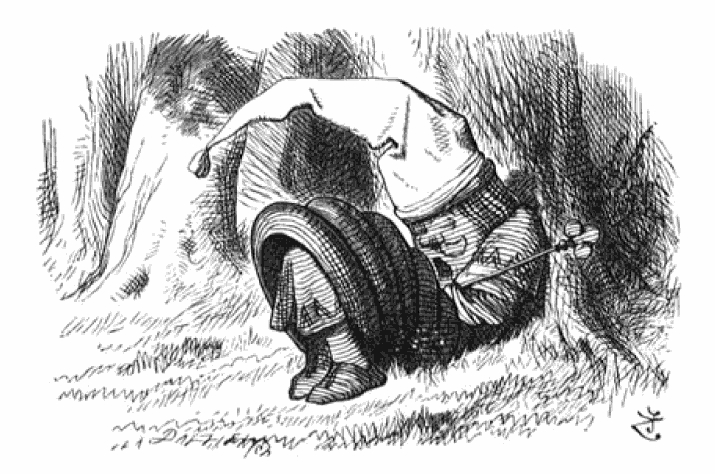
The Red King dreaming

Alice with the White Queen

Alice meets Humpty Dumpty

The White Knight accompanied by Alice

Alice arrives for her banquet

Alice follows a signpost pointing to the house of the twin brothers Tweedledum and Tweedledee, names familiar from the nursery rhyme, which she recites:

Tweedledum and Tweedledee
Agreed to have a battle;
For Tweedledum said Tweedledee
Had spoiled his nice new rattle.
Just then flew down a monstrous crow,
As black as a tar-barrel;
Which frightened both the heroes so,
They quite forgot their quarrel.

The brothers insist that Tweedledee should now recite to her – and they choose the longest poem they know: "The Walrus and the Carpenter". Its eighteen stanzas include:

"The time has come," the Walrus said,
"To talk of many things:
Of shoes, and ships, and sealing-wax
Of cabbages, and kings
And why the sea is boiling hot
And whether pigs have wings".

A noise that Alice mistakes for the roaring of a wild beast is heard. It is the snoring of the Red King – sleeping under a nearby tree. The brothers upset her by saying that she is merely an imaginary figure in the Red King's dreams and will vanish when he wakes. The brothers begin equipping themselves for their battle, but are frightened away by the monstrous crow.

=== Chapter Five. Wool and Water ===
Alice next meets the White Queen, who is absent-minded but can remember future events before they have happened: "That's the effect of living backwards ... it always makes one a little giddy at first". She advises Alice to practise believing impossibilities: "Why, sometimes I've believed as many as six impossible things before breakfast".

Alice and the White Queen advance into the chessboard's fifth rank by crossing over a brook together, but at the moment of the crossing, the Queen suddenly becomes a talking Sheep in a small shop. Alice soon finds herself on water, struggling to handle the oars of a small rowing boat; the Sheep annoys her by shouting about "crabs" and "feathers". After rowing back to the shop Alice finds trees growing in it, alongside a little brook – "Well, this is the very queerest shop I ever saw!"

=== Chapter Six. Humpty Dumpty ===
After crossing the brook into the sixth rank, Alice encounters the giant egg-shaped Humpty Dumpty, sitting on a wall. He is celebrating his un-birthday, which he explains is one of the 364 days of the year when one might get un-birthday presents. He is quite rude to Alice but provides her with translations of the strange terms in "Jabberwocky". In the process, he introduces her to the concept of portmanteau words: "Well, then, 'mimsy' is 'flimsy and miserable' (there's another portmanteau for you)". Just after she has parted company with him he has a great fall: "a heavy crash shook the forest from end to end".

=== Chapter Seven. The Lion and the Unicorn ===
All the king's horses and all the king's men come to Humpty Dumpty's assistance, and are accompanied by the White King, along with the Lion and the Unicorn. The March Hare and the Hatter (Note: First introduced in Chapter Seven of Alice's Adventures in Wonderland.) appear in the guise of messengers called "Haigha" and "Hatta", whom the White King employs "to come and go. One to come, and one to go".

The nursery rhyme about the Lion and the Unicorn ends: "Some gave them plum-cake and drummed them out of town". They are starting on the plum-cake when a deafening noise of drumming is heard.

=== Chapter Eight. "It's My Own Invention" ===
Alarmed by the noise, Alice crosses another brook, reaching the seventh rank and the forested territory of the Red Knight, who seeks to capture her, but the White Knight comes to her rescue, though repeatedly falling off his horse. He is an inveterate inventor of useless things. Escorting Alice through the forest towards the final brook-crossing, he recites "A-sitting on a Gate", a poem of his own composition. Carroll writes in this chapter:

Of all the strange things that Alice saw in her journey Through The Looking-Glass, this was the one that she always remembered most clearly. Years afterwards she could bring the whole scene back again, as if it had been only yesterday – the mild blue eyes and kindly smile of the Knight – the setting sun gleaming through his hair, and shining on his armour in a blaze of light that quite dazzled her – the horse quietly moving about, with the reins hanging loose on his neck, cropping the grass at her feet.

=== Chapter Nine. Queen Alice ===
Bidding farewell to the White Knight, Alice steps across the last brook, and is automatically a queen; a golden crown materialises on her head. She is joined by the White and Red Queens, who invite each other to a party that will be hosted by Alice. The two fall asleep.

Alice arrives at a doorway over which are the words "Queen Alice" in large letters. She goes in and finds her banquet already in progress. There are three chairs at the head of the table; the Red and White Queens are seated in two of them; the middle one is empty and Alice sits in it. She attempts a speech of thanks to her guests but the banquet becomes chaotic. Crying "I can't stand this any longer!" Alice jumps up and seizes the table-cloth, pulls it and plates, dishes, guests, and candles come crashing down in a heap. She blames the Red Queen for everything:

"And as for you," she went on, turning fiercely upon the Red Queen, whom she considered as the cause of all the mischief – but the Queen was no longer at her side – she had suddenly dwindled down to the size of a little doll, and was now on the table, merrily running round and round after her own shawl, which was trailing behind her. At any other time, Alice would have felt surprised at this, but she was far too much excited to be surprised at anything now. "As for you," she repeated, catching hold of the little creature in the very act of jumping over a bottle which had just lighted upon the table, "I'll shake you into a kitten, that I will!"

=== Chapter Ten. Shaking ===
Alice seizes the Red Queen and begins shaking her ...

=== Chapters Eleven. Waking; and Twelve. Which Dreamed It? ===
... and awakes in her armchair to find herself holding Kitty, who, she concludes, has been the Red Queen all along, Snowdrop having been the White Queen. Alice then recalls the speculation of Tweedledum and Tweedledee that everything may have been a dream of the Red King. "He was part of my dream, of course – but then I was part of his dream, too!" Carroll leaves the reader with the question, "Which do you think it was?"

== Themes ==
Through the Looking-Glass builds on the first book's themes of language, linguistic puzzles and wordplay. The poet W. H. Auden commented that words in the Alice books "have a life and a will of their own". Carroll's linguistic games parody the incoherence of real-world institutions and social structures. Like its predecessor, the book has legalistic elements that convey how systems of order can appear structured but remain completely arbitrary. As in a symmetrical chess game, many aspects of the story are mirrored or inverted. Cause and effect are often reversed: for example, Alice can only reach the Red Queen by walking in reverse. Through the Looking Glass juxtaposes sense with nonsense and sanity with insanity. The more consistent rules of Through the Looking Glass cast Alice more clearly as a child intruding into an adult world, and capable of seeing through the arbitrary nature of the social structures. The book pays more attention to the passage of time and has moments of playful rebellion against the adult world along with melancholy for the coming end of Alice's childhood: the beginning and end both have themes of winter and death, linked with the end of childhood.

=== Chess ===
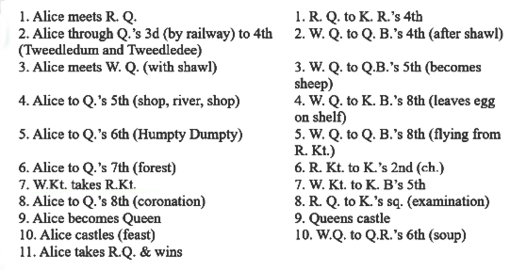
The chess game according to Carroll

Moves of White and Red

Whereas the first Alice novel has playing cards as a theme, Through the Looking-Glass uses chess; many of the main characters are represented by chess pieces, Alice being a pawn. The looking-glass world consists of square fields divided by brooks or streams, and the crossing of each brook signifies a change in scene, Alice advancing one square.

At the beginning of the book Carroll provides and explains a chess composition, corresponding to the events of the story. Although the moves follow the rules of chess, other basic rules are ignored: one player (White) makes several consecutive moves, and a late check is left undealt with. Carroll also explains that certain items listed in the composition do not have corresponding piece moves but simply refer to the story, e.g. the "castling of the three Queens, which is merely a way of saying that they entered the palace".

=== Poems and songs ===
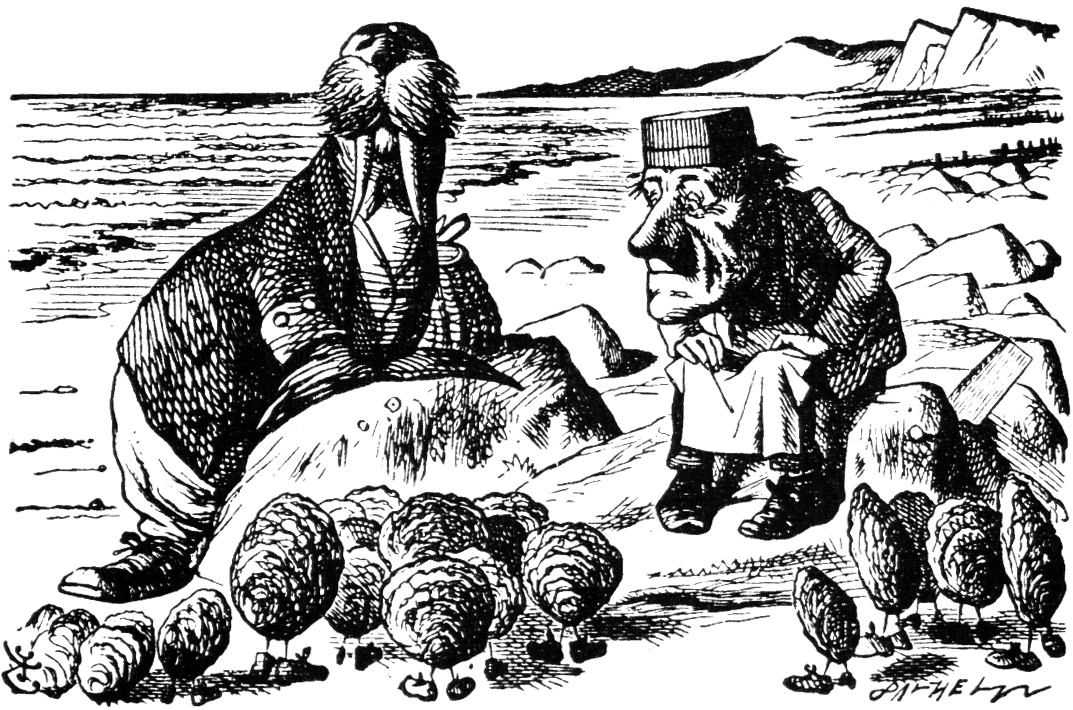
The Walrus and the Carpenter

- "Introduction" (prelude; "Child of the pure unclouded brow...")
- "Jabberwocky"
- "Tweedledum and Tweedledee"
- "The Walrus and the Carpenter"
- "Humpty Dumpty"
- "The Lion and the Unicorn"
- The White Knight's ballad, "A-sitting on a Gate"
- The Red Queen's lullaby, "Hush-a-by lady, in Alice's lap..."
- "To the Looking-Glass World it was Alice that Said..."
- The White Queen's riddle, "First, the fish must be caught..."
- "A boat beneath a sunny sky" (postlude; acrostic poem in which the beginning letters of each line spell Alice Pleasance Liddell, after whom the book's Alice is named.)

=== Parody, caricature and coinages ===
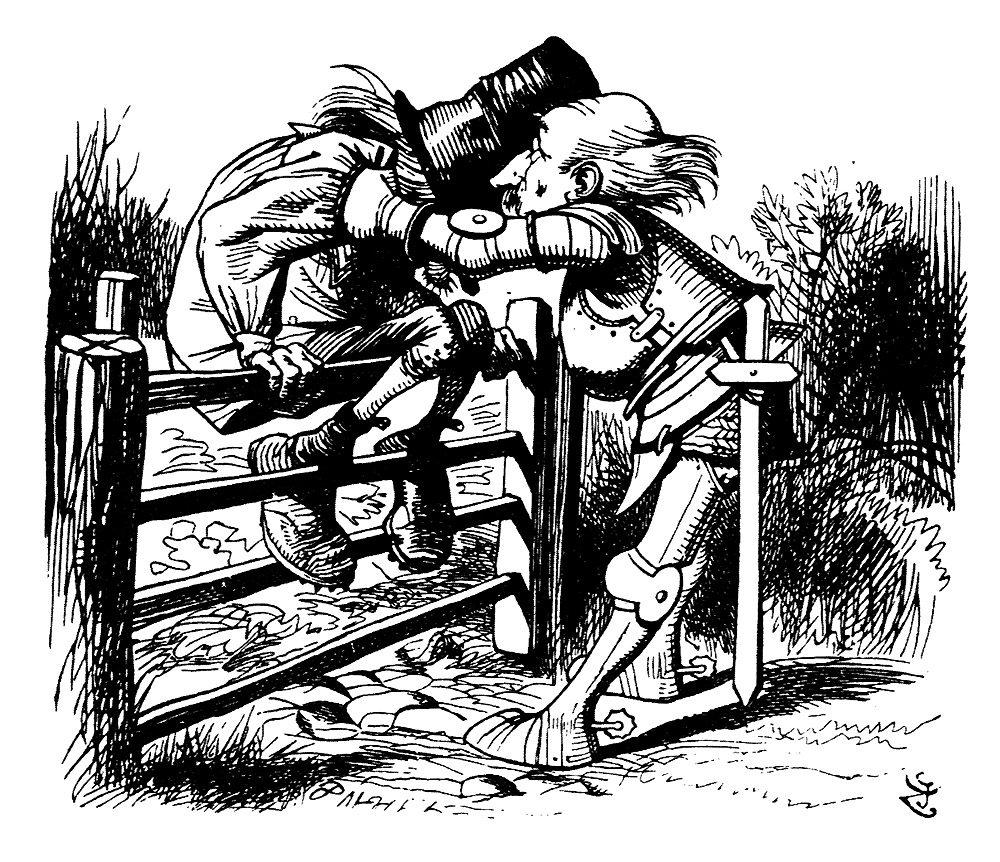
The White Knight's ballad

Alice's Adventures in Wonderland contains several parodies of Victorian poetry, but in Through the Looking-Glass there is only one: the White Knight's ballad, described by the literary critic Harold Bloom as "a superb and loving parody of Wordsworth's great crisis-poem 'Resolution and Independence'". Beverly Lyon Clark, in a study of Carroll's verse, writes that the ballad also contains echoes of Wordsworth's "The Thorn" and Thomas Moore's "My Heart and Lute".

Walter Scott's "Bonny Dundee" is clearly the basis for "To the Looking-Glass World it was Alice that Said", but Carroll simply uses its form and metre rather than parodying it. Although the rhyme scheme and metre of "The Walrus and the Carpenter" mirror those of Thomas Hood's ballad "The Dream of Eugene Aram", Carroll is not parodying the latter; he commented, "The metre is a common one", and said he had no particular poem in mind.

As in the earlier book, some of the characters incorporate elements of real people whom the Liddell sisters would have known. The Red Queen (described by the Rose as "one of the kind that has nine spikes") is based on their governess, Miss Prickett, known to them as "Pricks". The White Knight contains elements of Carroll himself and of a college friend, the chemist and inventor Augustus Vernon Harcourt, although Bloom also finds echoes of "the kindly, heroic, and benignly mad Don Quixote". In a 1933 essay Shane Leslie suggests that in Through the Looking Glass Carroll was satirising the controversial Oxford Movement, which sought to align the Church of England more closely with the Catholic Church, Tweedledum representing "high church" reformers and Tweedledee representing "low church" opponents of the movement. In Leslie's hypothesis there are other Oxonian and church references, the Sheep, the White Queen and the White King drawing, respectively, on Edward Pusey, J. H. Newman and Benjamin Jowett, the White and Red Knights representing Thomas Huxley and Samuel Wilberforce, and the Jabberwock the Papacy. The theologian and novelist Ronald Knox agreed that the Papacy was a target, maintaining that "impenetrability" – one of Humpty Dumpty's words – was a joke against the doctrine of papal infallibility.

Like Alice's Adventures in Wonderland, the book contains many phrases that became common currency. Here they include "cabbages and kings", "jam to-morrow and jam yesterday – but never jam to-day", "sometimes I've believed as many as six impossible things before breakfast", "When I use a word it means just what I choose it to mean", "un-birthday presents", "portmanteau words", "Anglo-Saxon attitudes" and "as large as life and twice as natural".

== Adaptations ==
=== Stage and cinema ===
Maidie Andrews as Alice in Alice Through the Looking-Glass, West End, Christmas season 1903–04

Most stage and screen adaptations of the Lewis Carroll novels concentrate on the more familiar Alice's Adventures in Wonderland, although many of them import characters from Through the Looking-Glass. (Note: Such adaptations are typically titled Alice in Wonderland but include characters interpolated from Through the Looking-Glass. H. Savile Clark's 1886 Alice in Wonderland devoted nearly as much prominence to Looking-Glass episodes as to those from the earlier book, but later dramatisations typically concentrated on the first book with fewer characters and incidents from the sequel. Examples include an 1897 American version by Holder Abbott, in which, as well as the principal characters from the first book, five Looking-Glass characters such as Humpty Dumpty and the White Knight appear. Eva La Gallienne and Florida Friebus's 1932 New York version featured seven Looking-Glass characters with twenty-two from Alice's Adventures in Wonderland. Walt Disney's 1951 animated adaptation interpolated Tweedledee and Tweedledum into the episodes from the first book, as did a 1972 film, Alice's Adventures in Wonderland.)

Through the Looking Glass has been adapted at least four times for the theatre. George Grossmith Jr presented a version at the New Theatre in 1903. Nancy Price adapted and presented the piece at the Little Theatre in 1935, and revived it for the Christmas seasons of the next three years. The cast included Frith Banbury (Unicorn), Ernest Butcher (Tweedledee), Michael Martin Harvey (White Knight), Esmé Percy (Humpty Dumpty) and Joyce Redman (Tiger Lily). In 1954 a stage adaptation by Felicity Douglas, Alice Through the Looking-Glass, was presented at the Prince's Theatre with a cast including Michael Denison (Tweedledee and Humpty Dumpty), Binnie Hale (Red Queen), Griffith Jones (Tweedledum and Red Knight), Carol Marsh (Alice) and Margaret Rutherford (White Queen). In 2001 Adrian Mitchell's adaptation, Alice in Wonderland and Through the Looking-Glass, was staged by the Royal Shakespeare Company at Stratford-upon-Avon. An almost complete adaptation of both of Carroll's novels, Through the Looking-Glass was adapted in act 2. The cast included Katherine Heath (Alice Liddell/Alice), Sarah Redmond (Tiger Lily), Jamie Golding (Tweedledum), Adam Sims (Tweedledee), Robert Howell (Walrus) and Chris Lamer (Carpenter).

A 2016 film titled Alice Through the Looking Glass uses some of the novel's characters, but the plot is unrelated to it.

=== Radio ===
The first full-cast sound radio version of the book was transmitted on BBC Radio in 1944, with a cast including Esmé Percy, Leslie French and Eric Maturin. A further radio version was broadcast as a five-part serial in 1948, with Angela Glynne as Alice, Derek McCulloch as narrator and a cast including Vivienne Chatterton (White Queen), Mary O'Farrell (Red Queen), Carleton Hobbs (Tweedledum and Lion), Norman Shelley (Gnat), Marjorie Westbury (Fawn) and Richard Goolden (White Knight).

A 1963 adaptation for BBC Network Three had a cast including Peter Sallis (Tweedledee), Peter Pratt (White King) and Geoffrey Bayldon (White Knight). A further five-part adaptation was broadcast on the Home Service in 1964 with Prunella Scales as Alice. BBC Radio 4 broadcast a new adaptation in December 2012, featuring Julian Rhind-Tutt as Carroll and Lauren Mote (Alice), Carole Boyd (Red Queen), Sally Phillips (White Queen), Nicholas Parsons (Humpty Dumpty), Alistair McGowan (Tweedledum and Tweedledee) and John Rowe (White Knight).

=== Television ===
A musical adaptation for American television in 1966 had a book by Albert Simmons, music by Mark Charlap and lyrics by Elsie Simmons. The cast included Nanette Fabray (White Queen), Agnes Moorehead (Red Queen), Ricardo Montalbán (White King), Robert Coote (Red King), Jimmy Durante (Humpty Dumpty), Jack Palance (the Jabberwock) and the Smothers Brothers (Tweedledum and Tweedledee). This version of Looking-Glass did not follow Carroll's original plot, using the characters as a jumping off point for a Wizard of Oz style quest narrative.

Some characters from Through the Looking Glass featured in a conflation of both books on BBC Television in 1960, (Note: The Adventures of Alice had, along with characters from Alice's Adventures in Wonderland, almost half the characters from Through the Looking Glass.) but the first British television adaptation of Through the Looking Glass was in 1973, featuring Sarah Sutton (Alice), Brenda Bruce (White Queen), Richard Pearson (White King), Judy Parfitt (Red Queen), Geoffrey Bayldon (White Knight) and Freddie Jones (Humpty Dumpty).

The second half of the all-star 1985 miniseries adaptation of Carroll's franchise covers this novel, starring Natalie Gregory (Alice), Carol Channing (White Queen), Ann Jillian (Red Queen), Steve Lawrence and Eydie Gormé (Tweedledum and Tweedledee), and Lloyd Bridges (The White Knight), among many others.

A 1998 television version featured Kate Beckinsale (Alice), Penelope Wilton (White Queen), Geoffrey Palmer (White King), Siân Phillips (Red Queen) and Desmond Barrit (Humpty Dumpty).

=== Other ===
A dramatised audio version, directed by Douglas Cleverdon, was released in 1959 by Argo Records. The book is narrated by Margaretta Scott, starring Jane Asher as Alice, along with Frank Duncan, Tony Church, Norman Shelley and Carleton Hobbs. The book has been the basis of musical compositions. Deems Taylor wrote an orchestral suite in 1919 with one of the novel's episodes represented in each of its five movements. Alfred Reynolds composed another orchestral suite based on the book in 1947.

== Translations ==
Through the Looking Glass has been published in many languages, including Afrikaans, Bengali, Chinese, Czech, Danish, Dutch, French, German, Hebrew, Italian, Norwegian, Portuguese and Russian. In French, Tweedledee and Tweedledum have been rendered as "Bonnet-Blanc" and "Blanc-Bonnet" and Humpty Dumpty as "Gros-Coco". The Rocking-horse-fly becomes La Mouche-à-chevaux-de-bois. The opening lines of "Jabberwocky":

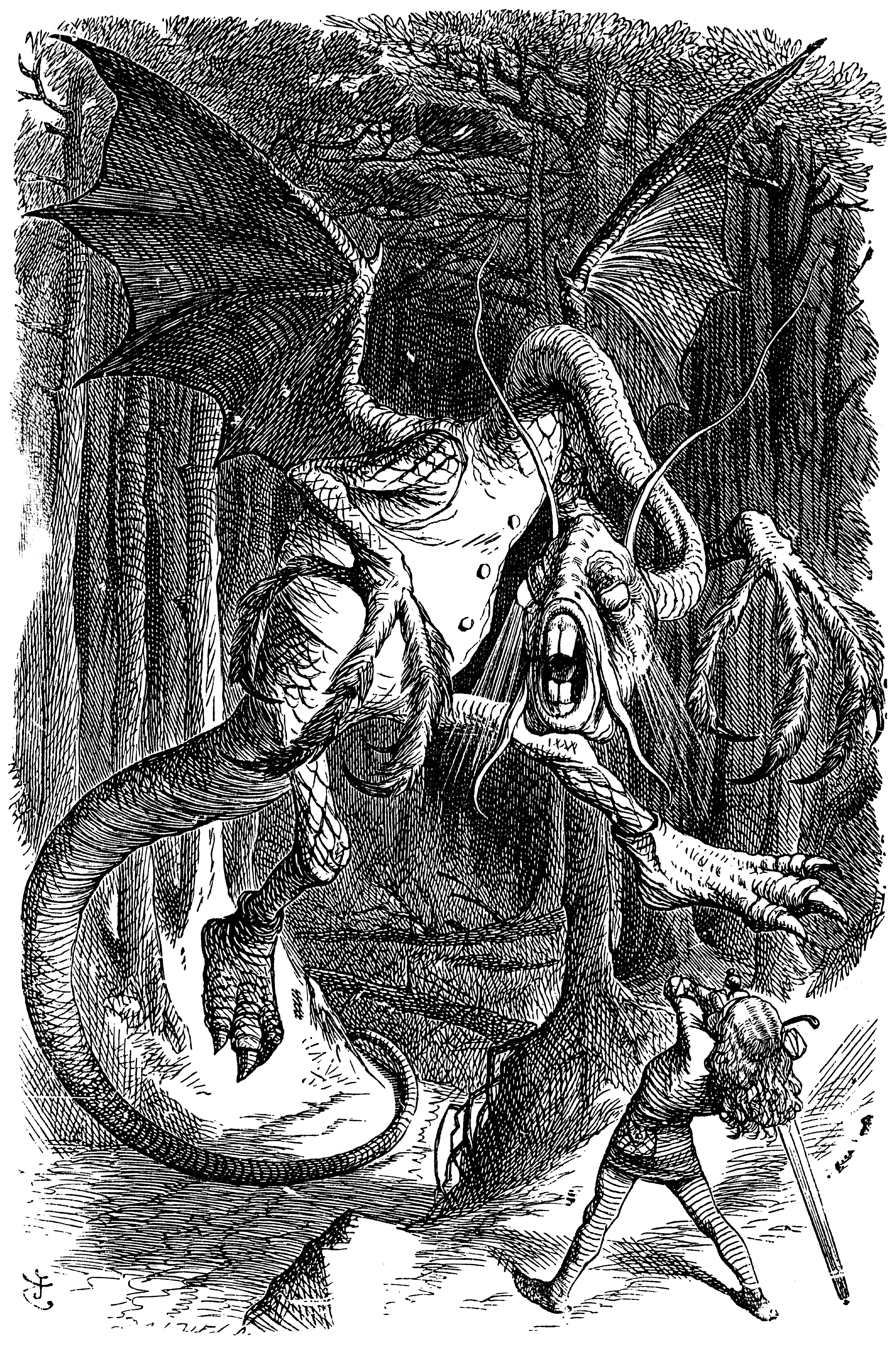
"Jabberwocky"

'Twas brillig, and the slithy toves
Did gyre and gimble in the wabe;
All mimsy were the borogoves
And the mome raths outgrabe.

become in French (present tense):

Il brilgue: les tôves lubricilleux
Se gyrent en vrillant dans le guave,
Enmîmés sont les gougebosqueux,
Et le mômerade horsgrave.

and in German, in the earliest of several translations: (Note: This German translation, published in February 1872, is by the Very Rev Robert Scott, co-compiler – with Alice Liddell's father, Henry Liddell – of the Oxford University Press's A Greek–English Lexicon (1843). Carroll then invited him to provide an Ancient Greek translation, but Scott declined. Ronald Knox devised one many years later. His version begins: καυσπροῦντος ἤδη, γλοῖσχρα διὰ περισκιᾶς στρυβλοῦντα καὶ στρομφοῦντ’ ἂν εὑρίσκοις τόφα, δεινὴ δ’ ἐπέσχε σωθρία βορυγρόφας (kausprountos ede gloischra dia periskias stryblounta kai stromphount an euriskois topha, deine d'epesche sothria borugrophas).)

Es brillig war. Die schlichte Toven
Wirrten und wimmelten in Waben;
Und aller-mümsige Burggoven
Die mohmen Rath' ausgraben

== Reception and legacy ==
=== Reception ===
Critical response was highly favourable. The Pall Mall Gazette singled out "Jabberwocky": "what pleases us most is the stanza with which the ballad begins and ends. Anything more affecting than those lines we rarely meet in the poetry of our day. Once admitted to memory, they will for ever maintain a place there". As to the book as a whole the paper judged it almost up to the standard of its predecessor – "there is not much to choose between them". Tenniel too was praised: "Those who remember his picture of the grin of the Cheshire Cat (not the cat, but the grin) will find a similar exercise of his skill in the woodcut representing Alice as she fades through the looking-glass".

The Illustrated London News found the book "quite as rich in humorous whims of fantasy, quite as laughable in its queer incidents, as lovable for its pleasant spirit and graceful manner" as its predecessor:

Humpty Dumpty and that inseparable pair of twins named Tweedledum and Tweedledee, are irresistibly comical, and so are the Lion and the Unicorn fighting for the Crown. Mr. Tenniel's designs, it need scarcely be said, are so good that the little volume would be worth buying for their sake alone.

The Examiner found the sequel not quite as good as the original but "quite good enough to delight every sensible reader of any age", It praised the "wit and humour that all children can appreciate, and grown folks ought as thoroughly to enjoy". The Times said:

The nonsense almost equals that of its predecessor, and is far more charming than half the literature bought and sold as solid sense. The charm of it is that it answers to its name; there is literally no sense in it, no lurking moral, no covert satire, no meaning, so far as we read it, of any sort whatever; it is at once the lightest and the brightest, and the most utter nonsense."

The reviewer in a New York newspaper, The Independent, wrote, "we know no higher praise than to say it is the equal of that charming juvenile Alice's Adventures in Wonderland ... Lewis Carroll has succeeded in giving to his books a purity, a daintiness, and an absolute adaptation to child-wants which are remarkable. Tenniel's illustrations, too, are exquisitely drawn".

Among more recent comments on the book, Daniel Hahn in The Oxford Companion to Children's Literature (2015) writes that sentimentality plays a larger part in Through the Looking Glass than in Alice's Adventures in Wonderland. He instances Alice's encounter with the Fawn in the wood and the description of her picking scented rushes while in the Sheep's boat. In Hahn's view, Alice's farewell to the White Knight has emotional overtones often thought to represent Carroll's sundering from Alice Liddell as she grows up.

Hahn also comments on the levels of threatened violence in the book. "Jabberwocky" introduces a note of real horror; and there is a frequent threat of death or dissolution. The oysters in "The Walrus and The Carpenter" are all eaten "despite (or perhaps because of) their childlike innocence"; and Alice is made to fear that she will disappear if she is in the Red King's dream and he wakes up.

=== Legacy ===
Although many later writers, including Jean Ingelow, Christina Rossetti, Charles E. Carryl and E. F. Benson, attempted to follow Carroll's lead, Through the Looking Glass, as opposed to Alice's Adventures in Wonderland, is rarely the identifiable influence. Lawrence Durrell draws on "Jabberwocky" in his collection of comic short stories Sauve qui peut (1966): "You can damn well take a hundred lines, Dovebasket ... 'In future I must not be such a blasted Borogrove'". Douglas Adams, in his Hitchhiker's Guide to the Galaxy series, borrows from the White Queen: "If you've done six impossible things this morning, why not round it off with breakfast at Milliways, the Restaurant at the End of the Universe?" Adams's character Mr Prosser shares Alice's concern about being a mere figment of someone else's dream: "He felt that his whole life was some kind of dream and he sometimes wondered whose it was and whether they were enjoying it". A disembodied quiet voice talks to Adams's Zaphod Beeblebrox in much the same way as the gnat in Through the Looking Glass talks quietly in Alice's ear.

Angus Wilson drew on Through the Looking Glass for the title of his 1956 novel Anglo-Saxon Attitudes but otherwise his book has nothing to do with Carroll's story. Another title drawn from Carroll's book is the Red Queen hypothesis – derived from her words to Alice "It takes all the running you can do to keep in the same place. If you want to get somewhere else, you must run at least twice as fast as that!" – that to survive, a species must evolve rapidly enough to counter evolutionary changes in ecologically competing species. The Oxford Companion to Children's Literature cites the Alice books – not specifically the second – as important influences on L. Frank Baum's The Wonderful Wizard of Oz (1900), and comments, "The Phantom Tollbooth (1961) by Norton Juster recaptures the Alice style more naturally than do most other imitations (though according to Juster, he had never read Alice at the time he wrote it)".

== Notes, references and sources ==
=== Sources ===
- Adams, Douglas (1979). The Hitch Hiker's Guide to the Galaxy. London: Pan Books. ISBN 0-330-25864-8.
- Amor, Anne Clark (1979). Lewis Carroll, A Biography. London: Dent. ISBN 0-46-004302-1.
- Bakewell, Michael (1996). Lewis Carroll: A Biography. London: Heinemann. ISBN 0-43-404579-9.
- Batey, Mavis (1980). Alice's Adventures in Oxford. London: Pitkin. ISBN 978-0-85372-295-3. OCLC 1193354915.
- Batey, Mavis (1991). The Adventures of Alice: The Story Behind the Stories Lewis Carroll Told. London: Macmillan. ISBN 0-33-356408-1.
- Bloom, Harold (1987). "Introduction". In Harold Bloom (ed.). Lewis Carroll. New York: Chelsea House. ISBN 0-87-754689-4.
- Bolch, Judith (2010). "Alice's Adventures in Wonderland". Masterplots. Vol. 1 (fourth ed.). Pasadena: Salem Press. ISBN 978-0-89356-085-0.
- Carroll, Lewis (1998) [1871]. "Through the Looking-Glass". Alice: A Special Centenary Edition. London: Macmillan. ISBN 0-333-72272-8.
- Carroll, Lewis (2003) [1865]. Alice's Adventures in Wonderland. London: Penguin. ISBN 978-0-14-143976-1.
- Carroll, Lewis (2004) [1872]. De l'autre côté du miroir. Paris: Ebooks libres et gratuits. OCLC 1352019576.
- Clark, Beverly Lyon (1987). "Carroll's Well-Versed Narrative". In Harold Bloom (ed.). Lewis Carroll. New York: Chelsea House. ISBN 0-87-754689-4.
- Cohen, Morton N. (2015) [1995]. Lewis Carroll: A Biography. London: Macmillan. ISBN 978-1-44-728613-4.
- Cohen, Morton N.; Anita Gandolfo (1987). Lewis Carroll and the House of Macmillan. Cambridge: Cambridge University Press. ISBN 0-52-125602-X.
- Durrell, Lawrence (1966). "Taking the Consequences". Sauve qui peut. London: Faber. ISBN 0-57-109224-1.
- Elwyn Jones, Jo; J. Francis Gladstone (1998). The Alice Companion: A Guide to Lewis Carroll's Alice Books. New York: New York University Press. ISBN 0-81-474245-9.
- Fowler, H. W. (1926). A Dictionary of Modern English Usage. Oxford: Oxford University Press. OCLC 1414849200.
- Gardner, Martin; Mark Burstein, eds. (2015). The Annotated Alice (150th Anniversary ed.). New York: W. W. Norton. ISBN 978-0-393-24543-1.
- Gaye, Freda, ed. (1967). Who's Who in the Theatre (fourteenth ed.). London: Sir Isaac Pitman and Sons. OCLC 5997224.
- Hahn, Daniel, ed. (2015) [1984]. The Oxford Companion to Children's Literature (second ed.). Oxford and New York: Oxford University Press. ISBN 978-0-19-969514-0.
- Knowles, Elizabeth, ed. (2004). The Oxford Dictionary of Quotations (fourth ed.). Oxford and New York: Oxford University Press. ISBN 0-19-860720-2.
- Knox, Ronald (1959). In Three Tongues. London: Chapman and Hall. OCLC 1150037202.
- Lancelyn Green, Roger (1998). Notes to 'Through the Looking-Glass'. Oxford: Oxford University Press. ISBN 0-19-283374-X.
- Leslie, Shane (1971) [1933]. "Lewis Carroll and the Oxford Movement". In Robert S. Phillips (ed.). Aspects of Alice. New York: Vanguard Press. ISBN 978-0-8149-0700-9. OCLC 1319183432.
- Mitford, Nancy, ed. (1957). Noblesse Oblige: An Enquiry Into the Identifiable Characteristics of the English Aristocracy. London: Hamish Hamilton. OCLC 1828447.
- Muir, Percy (1954). English Children's Books: 1600–1900. London: Batsford. OCLC 1244716233.
- Norwich, John Julius (1982) [1980]. Christmas Crackers. London: Penguin. ISBN 0-14-00-6052-9.
- Parker, John, ed. (1936). Who's Who in the Theatre (eighth ed.). London: Sir Isaac Pitman and Sons. OCLC 655107788.
- Price, R. G. G. (1957). A History of Punch. London: Collins. OCLC 1444144.
- Sarzano, Frances (1948). Sir John Tenniel. London: Art and Technics. OCLC 945160.
- Stanfield, Sarah (March 2020). "The Hitch Hiker's Guide to Wonderland: Douglas Adams and Lewis Carroll". The Carrollian. ISSN 1462-6519.
- Stedman, Jane W. (1996). W. S. Gilbert, A Classic Victorian & His Theatre. Oxford and New York: Oxford University Press. ISBN 978-0-19-816174-5.
- Weaver, Warren (1964). Alice in Many Tongues. Madison: University of Wisconsin Press. OCLC 1145784122.
