= Vernon Dalhart =

American singer-songwriter

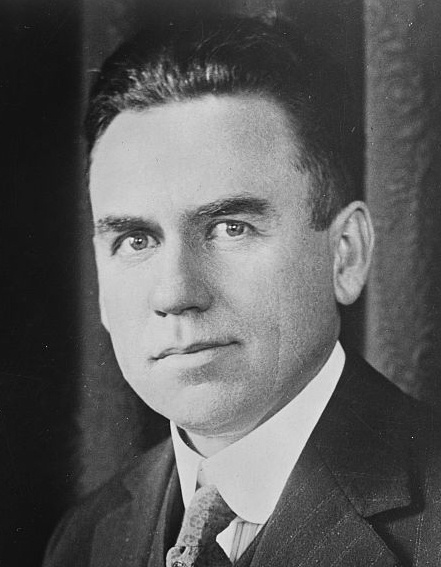
- Dalhart in 1917

Background information
- Born: Marion Try Slaughter; April 6, 1883; Jefferson, Texas, United States
- Died: September 14, 1948 (aged 65) Bridgeport, Connecticut, U.S.
- Genre: Country
- Occupations: Singer, songwriter
- Years active: 1913–1940
- Labels: Edison, RCA Victor, Columbia, Old Homestead, Bell

Marion Try Slaughter (April 6, 1883 – September 14, 1948), better known by his stage name Vernon Dalhart, was an American country music singer and songwriter who recorded music prolifically from 1917 into the 1930s. He aspired to be an opera singer, and began his career this way, but soon began recording country music inspired by his roots in farming and ranching. His recording of the classic ballad "Wreck of the Old 97" was the first country song reputed to have sold one million copies, although sales figures for pre-World War Two recordings are difficult to verify. Dalhart has since faded into relative obscurity.

== Biography ==
Dalhart was born in Jefferson, Texas, on April 6, 1883. He took his stage name from two towns, Vernon and Dalhart in Texas, between which he punched cattle as a teenager in the 1890s. When Dalhart was 12 or 13, the family moved from Jefferson to Dallas, Texas.

He sang and played harmonica and Jew's harp at local community events and attended the Dallas Conservatory of Music. He married Sadie Lee Moore-Livingston in 1901 and had two children, a son and a daughter. In 1910, on the recommendation of a Dallas Conservatory teacher, he moved the family to New York City, where he worked in a piano warehouse and took occasional singing jobs

=== Music career ===
Dalhart's education was in classical music. He had aspirations of being an opera singer, and in 1913 was cast in Madame Butterfly and H.M.S. Pinafore. When, he saw an advertisement in the local newspaper for singers and applied, he was auditioned by Thomas Alva Edison and went on to record for Edison Records. From 1916 until 1926, he made over 400 recordings of classical music and early dance band vocals for various record labels. In 1917 he requested to record the song "Can’t You Heah Me Callin’, Caroline?" for Edison Records. This song is what first introduced his talents into the country music tradition which, at the time, was popularly referred to as "Hillbilly Music;" the likes of which he often heard during his time spent ranching as a teenager. The trajectory of his music career was altered and, at this point, he began to record prolifically with labels such as Columbia and other popular labels of the day in addition to Edison Records.

Between 1927 and 1929 he also recorded with the Vernon Dalhart Trio, composed of Vernon Dalhart, Adelyne Hood, and Carson Robison.

In the 1920s and 1930s, he sang on more than 5000 singles (78s) for many labels, employing more than 100 pseudonyms, such as Al Craver, Vernon Dale, Frank Evans, Hugh Lattimer, Sid Turner, George White (with original Memphis Five) and Bob White. On Grey Gull Records, he often used the name "Vel Veteran", which was also used by other singers, including Arthur Fields. He was already an established singer when he made his first country music recordings.

I'm Drifting Back to Dreamland
Audio recording of Dalhart singing in 1923

Dalhart stated in a 1918 interview amidst criticism of his accent seeming artificial, "When you are born and brought up in the South your only trouble is to talk any other way ...the 'sure 'nough Southerner' talks almost like a Negro, even when he's white. I've broken myself of the habit, more or less, in ordinary conversation, but it still comes pretty easy."

=== Hits ===
Dalhart had a hit single with his 1924 recording of "The Wreck of the Old 97", a classic American ballad about the derailment of Fast Mail train No. 97 near Danville, Virginia, in 1903. Recorded for the Victor Talking Machine Company, the song alerted the national record companies to the existence of a sizable market for country-music vocals. It became the first Southern song to become a national success. With "The Prisoner's Song" as the b-side, the single eventually sold as many as seven million copies, a huge number for recording in the 1920s. It was awarded a gold disc by the Recording Industry Association of America (RIAA) and was the biggest-selling, non-holiday record in the first 70 years of recorded music. Joel Whitburn, a statistician for Billboard magazine, determined that "The Prisoner's Song" was No. 1 hit for twelve weeks in 1925–26.

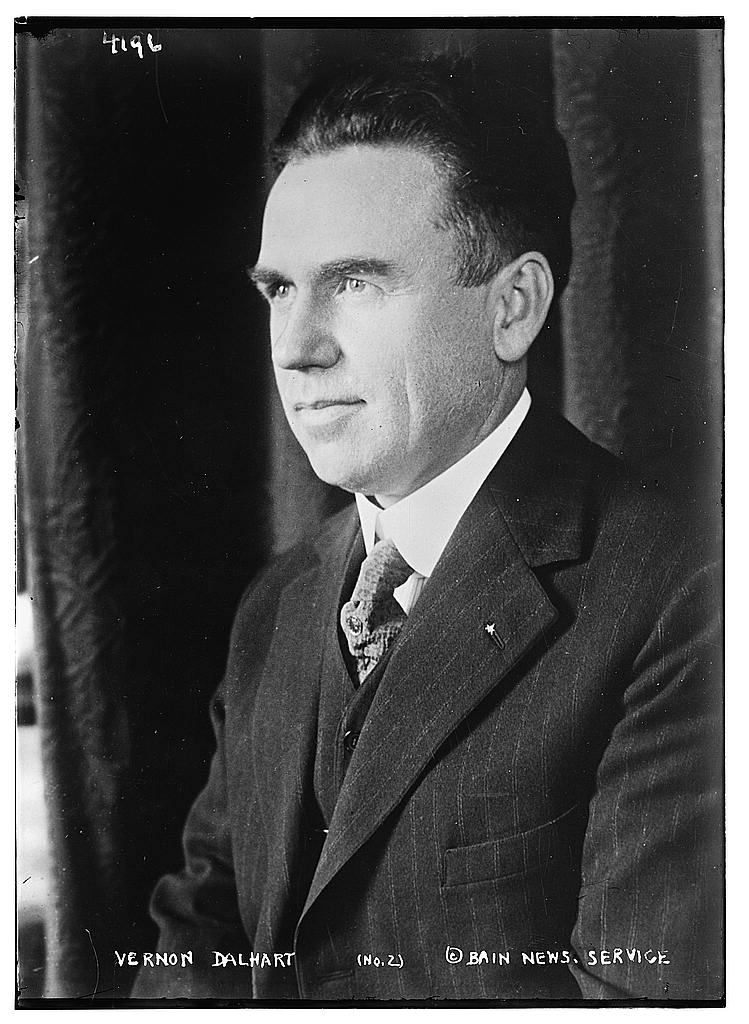

One of the recordings most associated with Vernon Dalhart, especially in the United Kingdom, is his 1925 track "The Runaway Train" (Talking Machine Co., Camden, New Jersey, Victor 19685-A, Shellac). This was played on BBC Radio's Children's Favourites between 1954 and 1982, and even now almost every compilation of children's records in the UK includes this track.

Wanting to repeat the success of the single, the Victor Company sent Ralph Peer to the southern mountains in 1927 to facilitate the Bristol Sessions. These sessions led to the discovery of singer Jimmie Rodgers and the Carter Family, after which Peer's royalty model would become the standard of the music industry.

=== Later life and death ===
By the late 1930s, Dalhart's popularity declined and he had lost much of his income in the Great Depression. He produced one final recording for Bluebird Records in 1939 then eventually retired and relocated to Bridgeport, Connecticut in 1940 where he worked as a night clerk for the Hotel Barnum.

He died on September 14, 1948 of a coronary occlusion at the age of 65. He is buried in Mountain Grove Cemetery in Bridgeport.

== Posthumous Events ==
In November 1955, conversations surround Dalhart and Jimmie Rodgers began to stir. Ralph Peer felt compelled to make a few comments about Dalhart's career. He made the fine distinction that Dalhart was not a "Hillbilly Artist" but merely a "popular artist who sang hillbilly songs." He categorized Dalhart as someone who "had the peculiar ability to adapt hillbilly music to suit the taste of the non-hillbilly population and labeled him as "a profitable substitute for a real hillbilly."

== Discography ==
Albums

Title	Year	Recording Date	Label
Old Time Songs: Original 1925-1930 Recordings	1976	1930	Davis Unlimited
1921-1927	1977	1927	Golden Olden Classics
The First Singing Cowboy On Records	1978		Mark56 Records
First Recorded Railroad Songs	1978		Mark56 Records
Ballads and Railroad Songs	1980		Old Homestead Records
On The Lighter Side	1985		Old Homestead Records
"The Wreck Of The Old 97" And Other Early Country Hits - Vol. III	1985		Old Homestead Records
Inducted Into The Hall Of Fame 1981	1999		King Records
Puttin' On The Style	2007		Document Records

== Awards and honors ==
- Nashville Songwriters Hall of Fame, 1970
- Country Music Hall of Fame, 1981
- Grammy Hall of Fame Award, "The Prisoner's Song", 1998
- Gennett Records Walk of Fame, 2007
- Songs of the Century, "The Prisoner's Song"
- Grammy Hall of Fame Award, "Wreck Of The Old 97", 2021
