= Walter Newton Henry Harding =

British-American pianist

Walter Newton Henry Harding (1883-1973) was a ragtime pianist, collector of rare books, primarily relating to music, and major donor to the Bodleian Library of the University of Oxford.

== Life and career ==
Harding was born in south London to a bricklayer. The family emigrated to the United States when Harding was four years old, where they settled in Chicago. While he retained British nationality, Harding never returned to the UK.

Harding reported that his mother noted his musical ability as a child, and saved money to enable him to have music lessons. After leaving school aged seventeen, Harding began a professional career as a pianist. He performed at music-halls and as a cinema organist, as well as frequently performing at churches and Masonic events.

== Rare book collector ==
As a young man, Harding developed an interest in old songbooks. He reported visiting the Chicago Public Library, where he looked at a collection of seventeenth-century broadside ballads. According to Harding's account, he began buying English and French seventeenth and eighteenth-century songbooks at a time when there was little interest in this material. His interest in songbooks grew to encompass printed verse and drama. His family home became the library of his collection, which was to become one of the largest bequeathed to the Bodleian Library.

Harding's collection, housed in the Bodleian Libraries, consists of primarily 17th-19th century European and American songbooks; 17th-19th century chapbooks in verse and prose; poetic miscellanies; 17th-19th century English drama, many of which contain songs; English jestbooks; 18th-19th century ballads and broadsides; and miscellaneous literature. His bequest to the Bodleian consisted of c. 195,000 volumes.

== Bequest to the Bodleian Library ==
In 1950, two decades before his death in 1973, Harding bequeathed his collection to the Bodleian Library. The gift was one of the largest ever gifted to the library, arriving in 1973, and weighing 22 tonnes. Of his decision to gift his books to the Bodleian, despite having never visited Oxford or returned to England since his childhood, he wrote in 1949: "I am a transplanted Englishman and so I wonder if my books should not go back to the land from whence they came and to the people that wrote the songs they contain."

== Bibliography ==
- Broadside ballads: see the Bodleian Ballads Project, Ballads Online
- W. N. H. Harding, 'British song books and kindred subjects' (Contemporary collectors, 33), Book Collector XI (1962), pp. 448–59.
- Sir John Stainer, Catalogue of English song books, forming a portion of the library of Sir John Stainer, with appendices of foreign song books, collections of carols, books on bells. London, 1891.
- C. L. Day and E. B. Murrie, English song books 1651-1702, a bibliography. London. Bib Soc, 1940. Indicating locations in the Harding collection.
- 'Miscellanies, anthologies and collections of poetry: Poetical miscellanies, song books and verse collections of multiple authorship', New Cambridge Bib of English Literature, vol. 2: 1660-1800, 1971, col. 327-430; cites Harding and Stainer copies when not found in the British Library or the Bodleian and not recorded in Wing's Short title catalogue 1641-1700, Case's Bibliography of English poetical miscellanies 1521-1750, or Day and Murrie's English song books 1651-1702.
- D. F. Foxon, English verse 1701-1750, 2 volumes, London, Cambridge University Press, 1975. (With locations in the Harding collection.)
- D. Hunter, 'The publication and dating of an early 18th century English songbook', BLR, XI,4(1984) 231-40.
