= Adelyne Hood =

American musician and vaudeville performer

Adelyne Hood (1897–1958), also known as Betsy White, was an American country singer, vaudeville performer, and fiddler. Born in Chester, South Carolina, Hood possessed exceptional musical talent from a young age, demonstrating proficiency in playing the violin, piano, and organ.

== Early life and career ==
Hood's musical career began in her teenage years when she was hired to play the violin at weddings and other formal events. In the early 1920s, she ventured into vaudeville performances, capturing audiences with her energetic stage presence and unique style that blended folk traditions with vaudeville entertainment. Hood often portrayed strong pioneer women through her songs, delving into the challenges and triumphs of frontier life.

== Collaboration with Dalhart and Robison ==
A significant turning point in Hood's career came when she collaborated with renowned musicians Vernon Dalhart and Carson Robison. Joining forces in the mid-1920s, they formed the Dalhart-Hood-Robison trio. Hood's mastery of the violin and her harmonious vocals perfectly complemented Dalhart and Robison's musical prowess, resulting in a captivating sound that resonated with audiences.

In 1929, Hood achieved considerable success with the release of her hit song "Calamity Jane." The track exemplified her ability to embody the spirit of strong, independent women and became one of her most recognized recordings. Throughout the 1920s, she continued to record with Dalhart and Robison, producing numerous memorable tracks.

== Later career and retirement ==
The advent of the Great Depression presented challenges for Hood and the music industry as a whole. Seeking new opportunities, she embarked on a tour of Europe's music halls in the 1930s, broadening her horizons and gaining valuable experiences. During this period, she temporarily recorded under the name Betsy White, showcasing her versatility and adaptability as an artist.

In 1936, Hood decided to retire from the music industry after marrying Alfred J. Phipps. She settled in Pittsburgh, Pennsylvania, where she explored new avenues in her life. Alongside her musical talents, she excelled as a pianist and artist. Hood became an active member of several Pittsburgh organizations, including Zonta, the Twentieth Century Club, and the Daughters of the American Revolution (DAR).

Despite her retirement from the spotlight, Hood made occasional appearances on radio programs, notably as Aunt Caroline. In this role, she showcased her singing and instrumental skills, particularly on the violin, while captivating listeners with her renditions of traditional Negro songs and the ability to create an engaging Southern atmosphere.

== Death ==
Adelyne Hood Phipps died on April 11, 1958, in Pittsburgh, Pennsylvania, at the age of 60.

== See also ==
- Vernon Dalhart
- Carson Robison
