= Fast Mail (Southern Railway train) =

Mail and express train

Overview
- Service type: mail and express
- Locale: Southern United States
- First service: November 2, 1902
- Last service: January 1, 1907 (as No. 97); April 30, 1971
- Former operator: Southern Railway

Route
- Termini: New York City (via Pennsylvania Railroad); Washington, D.C. New Orleans, Louisiana
- Train numbers: 97 (1902–1907); 35/36, 36/37

Technical
- Track gauge: 4 ft 8 1/2 in (1,435 mm)

The Fast Mail was a Southern Railway mail and express train that operated between Washington, D.C., and New Orleans, Louisiana. The southbound Fast Mail carried the train number of 97, and was later known by the nickname of "Old 97". One such trip made by the train, on September 27, 1903, derailed at Stillhouse Trestle in Danville, Virginia, and was later known as the "Wreck of the Old 97", for which the service was most well known.

The train's normal consist was two railway post office (RPO) cars, one express car, and one baggage car. It was the first exclusively mail and express train in the southern United States, and it was the last fast mail train in the United States to receive a subsidy for its fast service schedule.

== History ==
=== Background ===
The Railway Mail Service was established in the United States in the late 1860s, following the successful introduction of a dedicated railway post office (RPO) car on the Chicago and North Western Railway between Chicago and Clinton, Iowa, in 1864. As service improved and railroads were able to operate at faster speeds through the latter part of the 19th century, Fast Mail trains were introduced across the country beginning in 1875 on the New York Central Railroad and the Pennsylvania Railroad. A decade later, the Post Office Department hailed the importance of fast mail service saying in an 1884 report to congress:

"The establishment of this fast mail system is a vast improvement over the old service on slow passenger trains that were subject to frequent delays and failures to connect. The mails are now carried on special mail trains that have the right of way over all others, and are rarely behind time."

Their high speed service captured the attention of the country and also became the subjects of experiments in high-speed photography, such as by Chicago, Burlington and Quincy Railroad's official photographer Allen Green and his series of photographs of Burlington's Fast Mail trains. Fast mail trains, which often included a rider coach for the post office crew, were known to be a faster passenger ride, albeit often at a higher fare, than the railroad companies' premiere passenger trains.

=== Southern Railway service ===
Southern had been successfully operating fast mail service over its tracks since the 19th century, with one report in 1899 noting that Southern's service between New York and Atlanta, Georgia, was an average of 0.41 miles per hour (0.66 km/h) faster than the fastest similar service operated by New York Central between New York and Chicago. As Southern Railway and the Post Office Department studied the service, local civic and government leaders along the route provided endorsements hoping to see a better funded fast mail service. Another Southern Railway southbound Fast Mail train, number 35 which was scheduled to depart Washington at 11:15 am, had already been providing connecting passenger service from Philadelphia beginning in 1901. A 1901 Senate report recommended that a portion of the Post Office Department's appropriations should be used as "'special facility' pay" to fund a dedicated fast mail service on the Southern Railway.

Southern Railway inaugurated its dedicated Fast Mail service on November 2, 1902, with its first run to Atlanta done in a record 22 hours, and the train maintained its record-setting pace arriving in New Orleans after 33 hours. On its southbound run, train 97 normally carried no passengers other than the train and mail crews. The Pennsylvania Railroad operated the train between New York City and Washington, where it was handed off to Southern Railway. Southern Pacific Railroad also collaborated with a connection in New Orleans on its own fast mail trains westward into Texas.

=== Southern's cancellation ===
Rumors circulated in 1904 of the train's possible discontinuance; these were soon refuted by railway officials. In the 1906 appropriations bill worth over $191 million to fund the Post Office Department, the provision for $167,000 to pay for Southern's Fast Mail service was the only part of the bill that was disputed. The appropriations bill passed the House by only one vote before it was sent to the Senate. In the Senate, the train's subsidy was again a point of contention for the appropriations bill. With the loss of funding from the appropriations bill, train 97 was discontinued on January 1, 1907, making it the last fast mail train in the United States to receive a subsidy for its rapid service schedule. In the following years, Representative Kitchin's 1906 amendment to end the train's subsidy was used as a campaign issue against him.

Similar services reused the name and took its place such that by 1909, the southbound train was renumbered to 37, while its northbound equivalent was renumbered to 36. These other trains, unlike train 97, also carried sleeping cars and dining cars for passenger services.

== Accidents and incidents ==
On October 12, 1902, the northbound Fast Mail derailed as it accelerated out of Greensboro, North Carolina. The train had just gotten up to 40 mph (64 km/h) when the locomotive ran over a small piece of iron just 3/4 inch (19 mm) long that was left on the track and derailed. The engineer was able bring the train to a stop a little more than 200 yards (180 m) later with all the rolling stock remaining upright. After about an hour, the locomotive was rerailed and the train was again back on its journey northward.

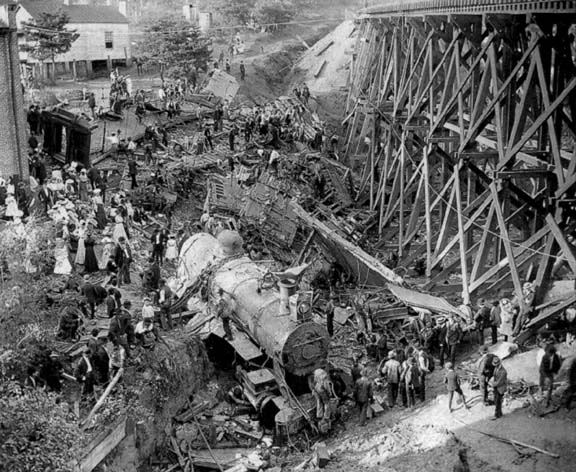
Aftermath a few days later of the September 1903 derailment and wreck.

The September 1903 accident inspired the famous railroad ballad - Wreck of the Old 97. As mentioned in some versions of the song, Old 97's locomotive, a class F-14 4-6-0 No. 1102 did make it to Spencer, North Carolina. It was repaired in the Southern Railway Spencer Shops and placed back into regular service for many years afterwards. In 1947, the Virginia State Conservation Commission erected a memorial plaque near the location of the eponymous accident.

Southern Railway's train 97 had previously been in another fatal accident earlier in 1903. On April 13, Train 97 left Washington at 8:00 am en route to New Orleans. As the train approached Lexington, it struck a large rock on the track causing the train to derail and become ditched killing the engineer and fireman. The locomotive that pulled the train is unknown. Southern #1102 had yet to be delivered to the railroad at that time.

Another accident involving this train occurred on June 8, 1903, near Fort Mill, South Carolina. Freight train number 74 had been given orders to wait at Fort Mill for train 97 to pass, but the engine crew misinterpreted the order and proceeded onto the single-track line. The two trains collided head-on about 1 1/2 miles (2.4 km) north of Fort Mill, knocking both train's engines off the track and completely destroying the first RPO of train 97. The crewmen in both engines were able to jump to safety and the mail crew on the Fast Mail were far enough back that they sustained only minor injuries.

On February 16, 1911, a group of men stopped and robbed the northbound Fast Mail in the early morning near Gainesville, Georgia. The thieves set off explosives in the express car to gain access to safes that were carried on it, and were reported as stealing packages worth $14,000 (equivalent to $483,750 in 2025). Posses were organized to find the perpetrators. After the robbery, the train crew was able to continue the train's regular northward journey, arriving at Greenville, South Carolina, with a visibly damaged express car, only 40 minutes behind its regular schedule; following a crew change there, the train continued on its regular route northward. The perpetrators and some of the loot were found and the men were arrested on March 1.
