= William Bernard (sailor) =

William Bernard (fl. 1849+) was a 19th-century sailor, miner and resident of San Francisco, better known as the notorious "Barnacle Bill" of American yore whose fictional exploits are chronicled in the ribald drinking song "Barnacle Bill the Sailor" — itself adapted from "Bollocky Bill the Sailor", a traditional folk song originally titled "Abraham Brown".

Neither MGM comedy titled Barnacle Bill has anything to do with Bernard.

Bernard first sailed into the San Francisco Bay aboard the ship Edward Everett on July 6, 1849, just as the California Gold Rush was heating up. Intent on striking it rich, he set out the next morning across the bay, accompanied by a shipmate named Mr. Phelps. They stopped first at present-day Yerba Buena Island, where the treasure of a lost Spanish galleon was rumored by local sailors and dockworkers to be buried, but they found it deserted except for a small colony of domestic goats. They did, however, discover the ruins of a large Tuchayune fishing village on the island's eastern shore, and reported seeing cremation pits strewn with human bones where the villagers ritually burned their dead. After camping for a few days on the small island, the two men moved on, exploring what is now Oakland before heading to the gold mines to seek their fortunes.

Little is known about Bernard's fate. He returned to Yerba Buena Island at a later date, if only to dry out, and lived there for a time before moving on again in search of fortune and fame.
