= Lacy =

- Pronunciation: /ˈleɪsi/
- Gender: Unisex
- Language: English

Origin
- Languages: Old French, Norman
- Origin: de Lacy (surname)
- Region of origin: France, England

Other names
- Variant forms: Lacey; Lacie; Laci
- Related names: Macy, Jacy, Stacy, Tracy

Lacy is a surname and a unisex given name.

People with the name include:

== People ==
=== Surname ===
- Alan J. Lacy (born 1953), American businessman
- Antonio Lacy (born 1957), Spanish doctor and surgeon
- Arthur J. Lacy (1876–1975), American politician and lawyer
- Benjamin W. Lacy (1839–1895), American lawyer
- Bill Lacy, U.S. political operative and business executive
- Bill N. Lacy, U.S. architect
- Bo Lacy (born 1980), American football player
- Caullin Lacy (born 2001), American football player
- Charles L. Lacy (1885–1942), American politician
- Chris Lacy (born 1996), American football player
- David Lacy, Scottish theologian
- Ed Lacy (1911–1968), American mystery writer
- Eddie Lacy (born 1990), American football player
- Edgar Lacy (1944–2011), American basketball player
- Elizabeth B. Lacy (born 1945), American lawyer
- Fanny E. Lacy (c. 1786–1869), British writer and activist
- Franz Moritz von Lacy (1725–1801), Austrian field marshal
- George Carleton Lacy (1888–1951), American Methodist Bishop
- Gilbert Lacy (1834–1878), English cricketer
- Harriette Deborah Lacy (1807–1874), English actress
- Henry de Lacy, Earl of Lincoln (1251–1311)
- Hugh De Lacy (1910–1986), American politician
- Jake Lacy (born 1984), American actor
- James Lacy (actor) (1696–1774), British stage actor and theatre manager
- James T. Lacy, American politician in Virginia
- Jim Lacy, American basketball player
- Jeff Lacy (born 1977), American boxer
- Jennifer Lacy (born 1983), American basketball player
- Jerry Lacy (born 1936), American soap opera actor
- John Lacy (1615?–1681) English comic actor and playwright
- John Lacy (born 1951) English footballer
- Kerry Lacy, American relief pitcher
- Kewan Lacy (born 2006), American football player
- Kyren Lacy (2000–2025), American football player
- Lee Lacy (born 1948), American baseball player
- Len Lacy (1900–1998), member of the Louisiana House of Representatives
- Maurice Lacy (general) (1740–1820), Irish-born Russian general
- Michael Rophino Lacy (1795–1867), Irish musician
- Norman Lacy (1941–2026), Australian politician
- Paul Eston Lacy (1924–2005), U.S. pathologist
- Peter von Lacy (1678–1751), Russian commander
- Philippe De Lacy (1917–1995), American silent film era child actor
- Preston Lacy (born 1969), American actor
- Roger de Lacy (died after 1106), Norman nobleman
- Sterling Byrd Lacy, American politician
- Steve Lacy (disambiguation), several people
- Suzanne Lacy (born 1945), American artist
- Tania Lacy (born 1965), Australian comedian
- Thomas Hailes Lacy (1809–1873) British actor, playwright, theatrical manager, bookseller, and theatrical publisher
- Thomas J. Lacy (c. 1806–1849), justice of the Arkansas Supreme Court
- Tyler Lacy (born 1999), American football player
- Venus Lacy (born 1967), American basketball player
- Walter Lacy (1809–1898), English actor
- William Lacy (died 1582), English martyr
- William Henry Lacy (1888–1925), American Methodist missionary to China
- William H. Lacy Jr. (1945–2016), American businessman

=== Given name ===
Men

- Lacy Banks (1943–2012), American sportswriter
- Lacy Clay (born 1956), U.S. Representative from Missouri's 1st congressional district
- Lacy Dock (1896–1963), American baseball player
- Lacy Gibson (1936–2011), American blues guitarist, singer, and songwriter
- Lacy Hunt, American economist
- Lacy Irvine Moffett (1878–1957), American Presbyterian missionary minister to China, and photographer
- Lacy Landers (1927–2011), American politician
- Lacy Overby (1920–1994), American virologist
- Lacy Ryan (c. 1694–1760), English actor
- Lacy Thornburg (born 1929), American lawyer and retired United States District Judge
- Lacy Walter Giles Yea (1808–1855), British Army colonel

Women

- Lacy Barnes-Mileham (born 1964), American discus throw track and field champion
- Lacy Crawford, American author, journalist, novelist, and memoirist
- Lacy Dagen (born 1997), American collegiate artistic gymnast
- Lacy Duarte (1937–2015), Uruguayan visual artist
- Lacy J. Dalton (born 1946), American country music singer and songwriter
- Lacy J. Davis, American writer and body image activist
- Lacy Janson (born 1983), American track and field athlete
- Lacy M. Johnson (born 1978), American writer, professor, and activist
- Lacy Schnoor (born 1985), American freestyle skier

== See also ==
- de Lacy, an old Norman noble family
- Lacy Baronets of County Suffolk, a title in the baronetage of the United Kingdom
- William Lacy Carter (1925–2017), American businessman and politician
- Justice Lacy (disambiguation)
- Lacy (disambiguation)
