= Lacy (disambiguation) =

Lacy is a name, a surname and a unisex given name.

Lacy may also refer to:

== Places ==
- Lacy Island, Nunavut, Canada; an uninhabited island in Qikiqtaaluk Region
- Lacy, Indiana, United States; an unincorporated community in Halbert Township, Martin County
- Lacy, South Dakota, United States; an extinct town in Stanley County
- Lacy, Texas, United States; an unincorporated community in Trinity County

== People ==
- Lacy Baronets of County Suffolk, a title in the baronetage of the United Kingdom
- de Lacy, an old Norman noble family

== Other uses ==
- "Lacy" (song), by Olivia Rodrigo

== See also ==
- lac Y, a lactose operon
- lacY, a lactose encoding gene
- Blue Lacy, the Texas dog breed known as Lacys
- Justice Lacy (disambiguation)
- Lace (disambiguation)
- Lacey (disambiguation)
- Laci (disambiguation)
- Lacie (disambiguation)
