= Lacie =

Lacie may refer to:

== People and characters ==
=== People with the surname ===
- de Lacie, a French surname and noble family
- Edward Lacie, a blacksmith featured on the 2018 TV episode "The Kelewang" of the competition TV show Forged in Fire; see List of Forged in Fire episodes
- Iames Lacie, an early American colonist at Roanoke Colony, Colony of Virginia; see List of colonists at Roanoke

=== Persons with the given name ===
- Lacie Burning, a Canadian First Nations artist
- Lacie Carpenter, violinist for U.S. band The Wizards of Winter
- Lacie Hickie Caley, architect of the 2001 St Austell railway station in St Austell, Cornwall, England, UK
- Lacie Jo Christopher, a murder victim involved in the 1991 SCOTUS case "Payne v. Tennessee"
- Lacie Choy, 2019 Miss Hawaii USA who competed in Miss USA 2019
- Lacie Rae Buckwalter Cunningham, an author recognized at the RUSA awards
- Lacie Doolittle, a member of the 'Double Dutch Forces' skip rope team, featured on the 2007 documentary film Doubletime
- Lacie Glasper, a musician, a member of the Minnesota-based band Sounds of Blackness
- Lacie Heart, pornographic actress who was nominated at the 2007 24th AVN Awards for 2006 films
- Lacie Heffron, the model for the Statue of Rosa Parks (Eugene, Oregon)
- Lacie Hull (born 1999), an award-winning U.S. basketball player, twin sister of pro-basketballer Lexie Hull
- Lacie Lybrand (born 1982), U.S. model and beauty pageant queen
- Lacie C. Neighbors (died 1955), USAF crewmember on a RB-47E Stratojet shot down by the Soviet Union; see List of aircraft shootdowns
- Lacie Pearman, Floridian, a murder victim of John Frazier; see List of people executed in Florida (pre-1972)
- Lacie Reed Stuckey, wife of U.S. American football player Darrell Stuckey
- Lacie Waldon, a U.S. author

=== Fictional characters ===
- LACIE, a fictional character from the 2015 videogame Star Billions
- Lacie, a fictional character from the Dormouse's tale in Lewis Carroll's 1865 novel Alice's Adventures in Wonderland
- Lacie, a fictional character from the 2018 film The Go-Getters
- Lacie, a fictional character from the 2021 animated film Barbie & Chelsea: The Lost Birthday
- Lacie (Pandora Hearts), a fictional character from the Japanese anime-manga Pandora Hearts
- Lacie Benton, a character from the videogame Bendy and the Ink Machine
- Lacie Delmont, a superheroine from the role-playing game Omlevex
- Lacie Donovan, a character from the 2023 U.S. film The Removed
- Lacie Fairburn, a character from the UK TV show The Evermoor Chronicles
- Lacie Pound, a character from the TV episode "Nosedive" from the TV show Black Mirror
- Lacie Wood, a character from the 2014 U.S. romcom film Christian Mingle The Movie

== Arts, entertainment, media ==
- "Lacie" (episode), 2021 season 2 TV episode of the worklife reality TV show The Wizard of Paws
- "Lacie" (chapter), chapter 67 of the Japanese manga serial comic Pandora Hearts; see List of Pandora Hearts chapters
- "Lacie" (song), a song featured in the 2009 Japanese anime show Pandora Hearts; see List of Pandora Hearts episodes

== Other uses ==
- LaCie (French: literally The Co. [the company]), a computer hardware company
- Large Area Crop Inventory Experiment (LACIE), a 1974 experiment for NASA, NOAA, USDA; using Landsat 1 data in the first large-scale use of remote sensing; led by Valerie Thomas; see Landsat program
- Lacie Road (KY 3321), Henry County, Kentucky, USA; see List of Kentucky supplemental roads and rural secondary highways (1–199)
- Lacie Slew, a racehorse, winner of the 2012 Maryland Racing Media Stakes; see Maryland Racing Media Stakes top three finishers and starters

== See also ==
- Lace (disambiguation)
- Lacey (disambiguation)
- Laci (disambiguation)
