= Waldon =

Waldon is a surname. Notable people with the surname include:

- Alton Waldon (born 1936), American politician
- Billy Ray Waldon (born 1952), American murderer
- Connor Waldon (born 1995), English footballer
- Keith Waldon, English football manager
- Lacie Waldon, American author

== See also ==
- Waldon, California, unincorporated community in California, United States
- Walden (disambiguation)
