= Lace (disambiguation) =

Lace is a lightweight fabric patterned with open holes.

Lace(s) may also refer to:

== Arts and media ==
=== Films ===
- Lace (1926 film), a German silent crime film
- Lace (1928 film), a Soviet silent film
- Laces (film), a 2018 Israeli film

=== Music ===
- Lace (group), Canadian-American country music group
  - Lace (album), their self-titled debut album
- Lace, one-person band of music producer and songwriter Pete Dello (b. 1942)
- Laced (album), a 1999 album by rap-metal group Reveille
- The Lace, a 1986 album by Benjamin Orr

=== Other uses in arts, entertainment, and media ===
- Lace (novel), a 1982 novel by Shirley Conran
  - Lace (miniseries), a 1984 TV mini-series, based on the novel
- Miss Lace, the protagonist of Male Call
- Lace, a character in Hollow Knight: Silksong

== People with the name ==
- John Henry Lace (1857–1918), British botanist
- Renāte Lāce (1943–1967), Latvian track and field athlete

== Technology ==
- Cable lacing, a method in electronics for tying wiring harnesses and cable looms
- Lace Sensor, a brand of guitar pickup
- Liquid air cycle engine, a type of spacecraft propulsion engine
- Luton Analogue Computing Engine, a computer developed by English Electric for military purposes
- Lunar Atmospheric Composition Experiment, deployed in 1972 by Apollo 17
- Low-power Atmospheric Compensation Experiment, launched in 1990 for the United States Strategic Defense Initiative

== Other uses ==
- Laces BC, a basketball club based in Miama, Florida
- Lacing (drugs), where one substance has been secretly mixed or added to another
- Latsch (Italian: Laces), a comune (municipality) in northern Italy
- Los Angeles Contemporary Exhibitions, an art gallery founded in Los Angeles, California in 1978
- Shoelaces, or laces, a thin cord fitted to each of a pair of shoes to keep the shoes in place
- Lāce, feminine form of the Latvian surname Lācis

== See also ==
- Interlace (disambiguation)
- Lacing, the pattern left by the foam on the inside of a glass of beer as it is drunk and the head moves down
- Lacing, a process in wheelbuilding, in which spokes are connected between the hub and the rim
- Lacey (disambiguation)
- Lacie (disambiguation)
- Laci (disambiguation)
- Lacy (disambiguation)
