= List of Pandora Hearts characters =

Pandora Hearts is a Japanese manga series features an extensive cast of fictional characters created by Jun Mochizuki. The story follows Oz Vessalius, the heir to the house of Vessalius, whose coming-of-age ceremony is set upon by strangers who condemn him for the sin of being alive and banish him into the depths of Abyss, an otherworldly dimension.

== Vessalius Dukedom ==
The Vessalius Dukedom is one of the Four Great Dukedoms and wields one of four black-winged Chains known as Gryphon. Before the tragedy of Sablier, the Vessalius were low-ranking viscounts. The family's fame and prestige was brought about by Jack Vessalius–third (and illegitimate) son of the viscount at the time—after his heroic actions during the tragedy of Sablier.

=== Oz Vessalius ===
Voiced by: Junko Minagawa

Oz Vessalius (オズ = ベザリウス, Ozu Bezariusu) is the main protagonist and a member of the prestigious Vessalius family. Initially portrayed as cheerful, kind, and self-sacrificing, he struggles with deep insecurities stemming from his father's rejection. He is thrust into a complex supernatural conflict after being cast into the Abyss during a coming-of-age ceremony for the mysterious "sin of his existence". There, he forms a contract with a powerful Chain named Alice (the B-Rabbit) and escapes back to the real world, only to discover that a decade has passed.

As the story progresses, Oz becomes entangled with the secretive organization Pandora and uncovers the truth behind his origins, the will of the Abyss, and his connection to Jack Vessalius. Though initially portrayed as optimistic and selfless, Oz gradually confronts the darker aspects of his identity, eventually learning that he is not the real Oz Vessalius but the true form of the B-Rabbit and the intended vessel to conceal Jack's soul.

=== Alice ===
Voiced by: Yukari Tamura (drama CD) and Ayako Kawasumi (anime)

Alice (アリス, Arisu) is the main female protagonist. Initially introduced as a powerful Chain in the Abyss, she is later revealed to be the infamous B-Rabbit (Blood-stained Black Rabbit), one of the most formidable beings in that realm. Alice forms a contract with the protagonist, Oz Vessalius, to regain her lost memories. Outspoken, impulsive, and fiercely independent, Alice exhibits a brash exterior but gradually reveals a more vulnerable side, particularly in her growing bond with Oz.

Alice is ultimately revealed to be the daughter of Lacie and a key figure in the events leading up to the Tragedy of Sablier. Her origins tie directly to the creation of the Abyss's Will and the deeper conspiracies surrounding the Baskervilles. Though not the original B-Rabbit—Oz himself holds that identity—Alice's fusion with B-Rabbit's power allows her to exist in the present timeline and play a pivotal role in opposing the destructive intentions of Jack Vessalius and the Abyss.

=== Jack Vessalius ===
Voiced by: Daisuke Ono

Jack Vessalius (ジャック = ベザリウス, Jakku Bezariusu) is a central character who initially appears as the hero known for having defeated Glen Baskerville a century prior. Jack is later revealed to be the true instigator of the Tragedy of Sablier, making him as the story's hidden antagonist. Charismatic and outwardly cheerful, Jack hides deep emotional instability and a manipulative nature, driven by his obsession with Lacie, a woman sacrificed to the Abyss.

Originally a carefree noble of the minor Vessalius family, Jack's relationship with Glen and Lacie profoundly shaped his descent into darkness. His actions, including manipulating the Abyss and using others, especially Alice and Oz, serve his ultimate goal of merging the world with the Abyss to fulfill what he believed were Lacie's wishes. It is later revealed that Oz is the B-Rabbit, a powerful Chain created at Jack's behest, and that Oz's body originally belonged to Jack.

=== Oscar Vessalius ===
Voiced by: Hideyuki Umezu

Oscar Vessalius (オスカー = ベザリウス, Osukā Bezariusu) is Oz's uncle. He is easy-going and very caring. Oscar was the one who found Gilbert and brought him to the Vessalius Dukedom. Both Oz and Gilbert treat him as a father figure. He gets along well with Break. When he received a letter from Ada (in which she stated that she had found someone who she likes), he took Oz, Gilbert and Alice to Lutwidge. He is later shot and killed by his Elder Half-Brother, Xai Vessalius, when he lets Oz and the others escape from the Baskervilles. He was said to be married to a sickly woman named Sara and had hopes of bearing a child. It is assumed she died without the chance to bear a child, as the camera he was going to use to take a picture of his son with was never used.

After eleven years, Jun Mochizuki finally revealed a crucial detail: Zai is Oscar's paternal half-brother. They share the same father but have different mothers a fact that explains why Zai harbors such intense hatred for Oscar.

=== Ada Vessalius ===
Voiced by: Ai Tokunaga (drama CD) and Kaori Fukuhara (anime)

Ada Vessalius (エイダ = ベザリウス, Eida Bezariusu) is Oz's little sister who adores him very much. After 10 years she attends Lutwidge (ラトウィッジ), a prestigious school for nobles, of which she is a prefect. She keeps in contact with Oscar via letter and causes Oz and his friends to sneak into Lutwidge as she wrote that she has found a person she likes. It is revealed that she was the one who gave Gilbert his precious hat, that made Oz and Oscar think that Gilbert is the one that Ada likes. Then she asked Oz to let her be the one to return Elliot's bag, but when Oz said that he will return Elliot's bag by himself, Ada was slightly disappointed.

=== Zai Vessalius ===
Zai Vessalius (ザイ = ベザリウス, Zai Bezariusu) is Oz and Ada's father. He appeared only in flashback, until he is depicted with a cold attitude toward his son and explicitly rejected him. It is shown he has a large scar across his face and is responsible for sending his son to the Abyss. He controls the chain named 'Griffin'. Although the Duke Nightray tells Elliot to hate the Vessalius, he and Zai seem to be friends. It was revealed that he was who planned sending Oz to the Abyss, along with the other Baskervilles. He knows where the Baskerville's final door was. He sent Oz to the abyss with the power of his Griffin. He was protected by Gilbert from being slashed by Oz. He believed that Jack is the cause of his stillborn son and wife's death, to the point he thinks Jack also killed his Younger Half-Brother's, Oscar, wife and child. When protecting Ada from a chain, he received a fatal wound on his back. Although he never ceased to hate Oz, Oz said that he had wanted to know Zai better.

After eleven years, Jun Mochizuki finally revealed a crucial detail: Zai is Oscar's paternal half-brother. They share the same father but have different mothers a fact that explains why Zai harbors such intense hatred for Oscar.

=== Rachel Cecile ===
Rachel Cecile (レイチェル = セシル, Reicheru Seshiru) is Oz and Ada's mother. Not much is known beyond the suspicion that the Nightrays caused her death. It is also said that Jack Vessalius might have poisoned her.

== Nightray Dukedom ==
The Nightrays are one of the Four Great Dukedoms. They are in possession of the black-winged Chain Raven. Once a prestigious family, they were seen as dark and traitorous after the tragedy of Sablier, having sided with the villains – the Baskervilles – at the time. The Nightrays and Vessalius are seen as opposites, and the Nightrays have a deep dislike of the Vessalius. It is revealed that their name was purposefully tarnished by Jack Vessalius.

=== Gilbert Nightray ===
Voiced by: Azuma Sakamoto (younger), Katsuyuki Konishi (older, CD drama), and Kōsuke Toriumi (older, anime)

Gilbert Nightray (ギルバート = ナイトレイ, Girubāto Naitorei), also known as Gil or Raven, is a central character known for his unwavering loyalty to Oz Vessalius, whom he serves as both a friend and protector. He is portrayed as a great cook and a person terrified of cats. Originally found amnesiac and wounded, he was taken in by the Vessalius family and served as a servant for Oz.

Gilbert is revealed to be a former servant of Glen Baskerville from a century prior. He possesses near-immortality due to his nature as a Baskerville. In the present, he joins the Nightray family at the invitation of Xerxes Break to obtain the chain Raven, which grants him the power to protect Oz and contain Alice's chain form, B-Rabbit.

=== Vincent Nightray ===
Voiced by: Jun Fukuyama (older) and Fuyuka Oura (younger)

Vincent Nightray (ヴィンセント = ナイトレイ, Vinsento Naitorei) is Gilbert's younger brother by one year. As the Vessalius family found Gilbert, the Nightray family similarly adopted Vincent. His left eye is golden like Gilbert's, but his right eye is wine-red, his long hair is golden in color and he is the only left-handed person. He loves his brother Gilbert to the point of slight obsession. He has an easy-going personality on the outside and is often seen smiling. However, it is shown that Vincent also has a dark, unstable side. He has a habit of carrying around scissors and cutting up stuffed animals with them. Break is often at odds with him, referring to Vincent as a dirty 'rat', which is fueled by Vincent sending Echo to attack Sharon.

Vincent is from 100 years ago. In Alice's memory, a young Vincent is seen walking among corpses, gouging out eyes and intestines with a pair of scissors saying that "It's not my fault, it's that person's fault, it's all because of that person", he was doing this to save his brother. He is also shown to be in alliance with the Baskervilles. It was he who called Zwei out from Echo, telling Echo that she is not required anymore in order to release her other personality. He is seen going on a date with Ada Vessalius shortly after those events. Meanwhile, his true thoughts show that he may be planning to harm Ada in order to draw Gilbert's attention, believing that she is an important person to Gil.

Some of his activities are revealed from 100 years ago. Due to the belief that red eyes will bring disasters, Gilbert and Vincent used to live on the streets where people would attack them whenever Vincent's eye was revealed. This continues until Gil and he are selected as Baskervilles. Vincent was fond of Jack Vessalius, who didn't care about his eye and even cut Vincent's hair which was used to hide his red eye, stating that Jack "loves" it. It was also shown that Jack tried to introduce the two to Alice since they were in closer age to her. Unfortunately, Alice immediately made fun of Vincent's red eye which caused Gilbert to pull her hair. This incident fueled Vincent's hatred towards Alice since she had made Gil "showed that kind of expression again" and Jack sighs in worry and began his habit of tearing up dolls (often rabbits) out of frustration and hatred. He was the prime suspect of Alice's death because of his hatred and his placement in Alice's memories until it is revealed later in the series that Alice committed suicide because of Jack. In one flash-back, Vincent is shown threatening Alice and even giving her the corpse of her cat, Cheshire, after he'd gouged the cat's eyes out.

When Vincent found out about Gil's death and how he will be Glen's next body through a ritual from Alice, he was visited by a mysterious lady (later revealed as Miranda Barma) who told him how to prevent the ritual by opening the Abyss's door. It is revealed later in the series that Jack and she had used Vincent as a tool to open the Gates of the Abyss by using his abilities as a "child of misfortune". Believing in them, young Vincent opens the door, playing a major role in causing the Tragedy. He is engulfed by the Abyss with the whole city and his brother, and is returned to the world after 100 years had passed in the world.

Vincent has a legal contract with the Dormouse. It is revealed in Retrace 61 that he was the real headhunter all along and had formed an illegal contract with a chain called Demios. He also forms a pact with Leo asking him to either kill him or erase his existence from the world so that his brother, Gilbert, can "stay in the sunshine forever." However Break and Ada make change to that and now Vincent no longer desires to die. It was revealed that, all along, despite not being afraid of death, Vincent had wished for forgiveness. He later dies of age but not before bringing a reincarnated Oz and Alice to Gilbert.

In the anime, Vincent is shown to have been the one to have killed Alice during the Tragedy of Sablier.

=== Echo/Noise ===
Voiced by: Ryō Hirohashi

Echo (エコー, Ekō) is Vincent's personal servant. She is somehow emotionless, like a puppet and she treats Vincent's words as law. Oz calls her "Echo-chan". Echo fights with blades that come out of her long sleeves. It may seem that Vincent treasures her, but he actually does not care that much. He goes as far as to poison her to prove that the antidote for the poison that he poisoned Sharon with works. Echo is shown to have her own mind when she saves the bottle of antidote that Vincent almost drops off the veranda, because she remembered what Oz said the first time they meet. She admits that she finds Vincent annoying. She seems to have developed feelings for Oz after both of them went to the festival together and Oz shows her what it is like to have fun. He also gives her a hair ornament which he was supposed to give to the girl he likes, although he didn't know that. She is known to have another personality called Noise, who is actually Zwei. Zwei loves Vincent deeply and is the original personality inside Echo's body. Zwei controls a chain called Doldee that can control other people or immobilize them using strings. Zwei used her chain to immobilize Gilbert, and also used it within Echo to capture Sharon.

With Zwei in possession of the body, she rejoins the Baskerville group and goes to Sablier along with Lottie, where she meets Elliot and Leo. She immobilizes Leo using her chain, Doldee, but is only able to control his body, not his mind. Meanwhile, Lottie stops Elliot. It is shown that Break thinks it is unfair for him stabbing her through the hand and stomach after she had saved the antidote that saved Sharon Rainworth's life.

Noise was an aberration within the Baskervilles, which caused her to have a fragile mind. In order to prevent her from breaking apart, her chain Doldee kept creating disposable personalities called "Doldum", one of which is Echo. Noise had wanted Vincent to be hers, but since he couldn't return her feelings, she decided it would be better he died instead of belong to anyone else. Upon entering the Abyss, Doldee tried to take over Noise's body as she was already crumbling from her complicated feelings for Vincent, but was stopped by Echo. It seemed that Doldee already knew that Noise's body was at its limit, and wanted to help Noise achieve her goal, which was actually protecting Vincent like a little brother instead of killing him.

=== Elliot Nightray ===
Voiced by: Hirofumi Nojima

Elliot Nightray (エリオット = ナイトレイ, Eriotto Naitorei) is a student at Lutwidge that, along with his love interest Leo, catches Oz's attention as they can play the tune from his pocket watch. He first meets Oz in the Latowidge library where they get into a fight over a character in the novel series "Holy Knight" (Elliot spoils the ending for Oz's favorite character, Edgar). He also doesn't like Ada calling his name and despises how the Vessalius seem to get away with anything just because they were heroes 100 years ago. Ada, however, thinks he is a nice and dependable person deep down. He is the legitimate heir of the Nightray Dukedom and consequently the brother of the adopted Vincent and Gilbert. He is adept with the sword and keeps a blade with his family crest in a violin case. Elliot has a strong sense of right and wrong and tends to say things without consideration to the other party. It is through this straightforwardness, however, that Oz finally overcomes the shadows of his past. He has said that the tune he and Leo were playing was composed by him and is called "Lacie", implying a strong connection between him and Glen Baskerville. He is also shown to suffer from nightmares, which is implied that Eliot possesses some of Glen's memories. Elliot meets Oz and co. at Sablier. He takes them into the Nightray's orphanage at Sablier, where Oz meets Phillipe. Elliot sticks up for Oz when Zai shows up.

After these events, Elliot hears about a mysterious killer known as the head hunter who in the past was targeting members of his family, also killing his brothers. Upon hearing that there was another murder committed by the same person, he attempts to find the killer himself.

Elliot is worried about Leo, since he has not talked to him much lately, and seems to be feeling unwell at Oz's second coming of age ceremony. Elliot is also shocked when he sees Leo talking to Isla Yura, and wonders what their connection may be. He seems to be upset that Leo didn't tell him anything, ending up in a heavy fight with him. In Retrace 52, Elliot faints with a vision of his nightmare where he kills everyone with his sword and after waking up and finding Vanessa dead, Break accuses Elliot of being the Headhunter. In Retrace 57, it is found that he is the Headhunter. In Retrace 58 it is revealed that during a past trip to the orphanage in Sablier he and Leo went looking for several missing children that had wandered into the hole that connected to the Abyss. They found two of the children killed and upon Leo finding a third child, they were attacked by one of the orphans that had lost control of Humpty Dumpty. Attempting to protect Leo, Elliot was skewered by Humpty Dumpty and almost died. Leo stopped Humpty Dumpty and made Elliot drink its blood and pronounce its name in order for Elliot to form a contract and be saved. Elliot forgot everything afterwards, believing that he had only 'slipped, hit his head, and was knocked out on the ground'. He later overhears his older brothers Claude and Ernest talking about murdering Gilbert and Vincent. They had planned to set fire to their house while their mother, Elliot, and the rest of the household escape, leaving Gilbert and Vincent to burn to death. Elliot, enraged, attempts to come out of hiding to confront them when Ernest adds that they will also kill Leo. Overcome with shock, Elliot unconsciously summoned Humpty Dumpty and killed his brothers. Humpty Dumpty causes him to once more forget what he had done and he has been living in denial since. However, since he remembered everything in Retrace 58, the wounds from before he contracted with Humpty Dumpty return.

As it turns out, the supposed implications of Elliot being the next container of Glen Baskerville is false. The memories from Retrace 39 are actually from when he killed his brothers, not from the Tragedy of Sablier. It is in fact Leo who had written the revised version of 'Lacie' and Elliot claimed credit because of his anger at Oz. In Retrace 59, Elliot is asked by his chain (Humpty Dumpty) to forget all that he has just remembered. Elliot wants to remember however it is against his chain's wishes. Vincent tells him that by rejecting his chain, he could perform a double suicide with his chain. Realizing that if he were to stay alive, other people would have to carry the burden of his life as well as the fact that he was soon going to die anyway (due to the injuries that reappeared and his seal's revolution) he decided to reject his chain; both he and Humpty Dumpty died. In Retrace 61 in a flashback during when Vincent was with Elliot nearing death Elliot whispered something to Vincent that need to be delivered to Leo. Vincent told Leo that the message was "I'm sorry, Leo." In the anime, Elliot is heavily implied to be the reincarnation of Glenn the whole time and is shown to have created the song 'Lacie' himself without knowing how he knew to make it; furthermore, his memories are of a city filled with flames while the screams of people dying echo around him.

=== Leo Baskerville ===
Voiced by: Akeno Watanabe

Leo Baskerville (リーオ = バスカヴィル, Rīo Basukaviru) is boy with dark messy hair and round glasses. He is a student at Lutwidge and serves Elliot. He has a calm and collected demeanor and is hardly rattled by anything. Leo is very observant and discovered Oz's identity as an intruder. Despite being Elliot's servant and love interest, he doesn't always take his side and will make him apologize if needed. Also, Leo could hit Elliot if he's doing or saying something wrong to his eyes. He is rarely seen without Elliot. Leo carries a gun and is apparently hopeless with it and swords, according to Elliot. Elliot witnesses a friendly little chat between Leo and Isla Yura, wondering how they are related. Leo thinks Isla Yura is the culprit of the deaths of six children of the orphanage and the one who made Phillipe forget about his fathers's death; being this the first time we get to see him acting saddened, angry and restless.

In retrace 50 Leo tells Oz the way he and Elliot met two years ago, revealing that they indeed disliked each other at first but with the mutual love for piano they developed a bond through music. Elliot says Leo always beat the people who tried to cut his hair. When Elliot asks why he wants to hide his eyes (since they are such a "beautiful color", according to Elliot's thoughts) Leo answers that he doesn't want to hide his eyes but he doesn't want to see. Elliot doesn't get it and Leo responds that he doesn't want to see the world. Leo asks him to buy him a pair of glasses to cover his eyes so that everything would be fine (it means he doesn't really need them).

Leo rejected Elliot when the second asked him to be his servant, but at the end he accepted because "he was interested in the Nightray Household's books collection".

Leo tells Oz he reveres Elliot and that he'd kill any of Elliot's enemies even if it is Oz or himself and also asks Oz to kill him with his own hands if he ends up being the main suspect of danger. In Retrace 58 it is revealed that he is the one who made Elliot become a contractor. He is also the one who composed 'Lacie'. While panicking for Elliot who had been fatally wounded by Humpty Dumpty, mysterious figures appeared in his mind and told him the only way to save Elliot would be to make him for a contract with Humpty Dumpty. It is later on shown that one of the figures is Glen Baskerville, making Leo the next 'container' for his soul.

In Retrace 61 Vincent goes to ask Leo a favour saying that he will serve him in return also letting him know that he is the head of the Baskervilles. Leo agrees but only if he would cut his own hair (which we know from Retrace 50 that he almost killed a man trying to do so) due to him being "tired of hiding." Leo's face is revealed to be almost identical to Alice's. According to the text around the previous page, his eyes are black with pools of reflected light; like the abyss. It is revealed that recent events have driven him insane. After Leo asks Oz to join him to try to repeat the Tragedy of Sabrier, and Oz refuses, Leo tries to send him into the Abyss, but fails when Gilbert uses Raven on Leo's Jabberwock. After being taken down by Jack using B-Rabbit he eventually gets up again and Oswald's soul, which resides within Leo, took over his body and ordered Gilbert to shoot Oz/Jack as he was his servant. After that fails he went back into time with Vincent to kill Lacie to prevent the tragedy of Sablier from happening but Cheshire places them into the tragedy instead and later Leo tried to resist Oswald but failed.

=== Fred, Claude and Ernest Nightray ===
Fred, Claude and Ernest Nightray are the older brothers to Elliot Nightray who were killed by the mysterious head hunter. Fred was the first to be killed, which resulted in Ernest and Claude going after the head hunter while instructing Elliot to flee the country with their mother. The brothers appear to have disliked Vincent and Gilbert, warning Elliot to stay away from them as they did not consider them a part of the Nightray family. Elliot himself they seemed to have dotted on. Claude was upset with their father for allowing Gilbert to form a contract with Raven as he was not a descendant of the Nightray family. Ernest is the one who tells Eliot that as he's already fourteen, he needs a servant (in a fashion way), and then takes him to Sablier to choose between the orphans. Claude and Ernest ended up getting scolded for taking him to Sablier before he matured like his father wanted before telling him about Sablier.

=== Vanessa Nightray ===
Vanessa Nightray (ヴァネッサ = ナイトレイ, Vanessa Naitorei) is Elliot's older sister, not much is known about her but she seems to dislike Oz. It is known that Vanessa and Elliot were very close and that she taught him of things like the language of flowers. In Retrace 52, Vanessa becomes another victim to the head hunter (Elliot) thus being beheaded just like Fred, Claude and Ernest before her.

=== Bernice Nightray ===
Bernice Nightray (ヴァーニス = ナイトレイ, Vānisu Naitorei) is the mother of Elliot, Fred, Claude, Ernest and Vanessa. It is said that her sanity began to crumble when her eldest sons were murdered by the headhunter. She was then manipulated by Isla Yura, and became part of his cult. In Retrace 56, she is shown greeting Elliot in a room where Leo lies on an altar, ready to be sacrificed for the purpose of Yura's ritual, much to Elliot's horror. Not much is known about her other than the fact that she is clearly insane. She is killed in Retrace 57 by Elliot when she attempted to sacrifice Leo.

== Rainsworth Dukedom ==
The Rainsworth family is one of the Four Great Dukedoms, and contracts the black winged Chain Owl. The Rainsworths are the only of the Four Great Dukedoms uninvolved in the tragedy of Sablier, and were recruited as an 'impartial party' – likely due to their royal lineage. In truth, Jack wanted an 'impartial party' which would side with him (and the Vessalius Dukedom) whenever the Four Great Dukedoms were in conflict.

=== Sheryl Rainsworth ===
Sheryl Rainsworth (シェリル = レインズワース, Sheriru Reinzuwāsu) is the duchess of the Rainsworth family, alongside Zai Vessalius (who was later replaced by Oscar Vessalius because of Zai's betrayal), Rufus Barma and Barnard Nightray, all of whom she has been close friends with for a long time. She is also the mother of Shelly Rainsworth and the grandmother of Sharon Rainsworth. She appears as an elderly woman who uses a wheelchair, which makes many people underestimate her, though she is exactly the opposite of what people may think. Sheryl herself is generally a very happy and cheerful person, even in the most serious circumstances, though she can be very dangerous when she needs. She obtained the chain Owl to lead the family within Pandora, though she did so long after her close friend Rufus Barma had contracted with Dodo.

Sheryl Rainsworth was meant to appear at Oz Vessalius' coming of Age Ceremony but she became ill and had to have her daughter, Shelly take care of her, so she sent Sharon in her place. She possesses a sharp-bladed fan, like Rufus Barma and Sharon Rainsworth, and uses it as her weapon. Once she stopped the fight breaking out between Oz and Rufus, who was about to attack Oz with his metal fan. Sheryl threw her own fan directly between those two and it got in a pillar behind them, shocking all in the room. Sheryl was the one who stopped Rufus from arresting Xerxes Break, as well as taking Alice into Pandora for her relationship to The Will of the Abyss. She was one of the first who noticed that Break had become blind.

Duchess Rainsworth is very close with Rufus Barma, who she calls "Ruf", since they are childhood friends. To protect him, she often lets him to play her valet when they are in public, while Rufus creates an illusion of himself to occupy his position within Pandora. They are often seen discussing new information and future plans. It is believed that Rufus has love feelings for Sheryl, but she doesn't return them. Also it is suggested that Duke Barma is the one who attacked her in manga Ch. LXIV.

Sheryl didn't use her true power yet, but she is considered to be the most powerful and scariest of the four dukes. Her chain "Owl" has the power to cast a soundless darkness, which she used to help Break defeat the Baskervilles, as he couldn't see anyway. Owl also has the ability to become huge and serve for transport needs.

=== Shelly Rainsworth ===
Shelly Rainsworth (シェリー = レインズワース, Sherī Reinzuwāsu) is the daughter of Sheryl Rainsworth, and the mother of Sharon Rainsworth. She is looks like an older version of Sharon. She is only seen with a blue flower dress and a dark purple choker with a green jade on it. It appears that she was a loving mother and that she cared greatly for her daughter, Sharon. She has only appeared in flashbacks as the one whose kindness managed to get through to Xerxes Break during his long depression after returning from the abyss. Break also mentions her as the reason he gave up Cheshire's Bell to save Sharon, saying Shelly would kill him, if anything happened to her daughter.

=== Sharon Rainsworth ===
Voiced by: Yui Horie (drama CD) and Kana Hanazawa (anime)

Sharon Rainsworth (シャロン = レインズワース, Sharon Reinzuwāsu) is the Lady of the Rainsworth household and a member of Pandora. She looks like a thirteen-year-old girl, but she is actually 23 years old. Her appearance does not change from her first meeting with Oz to after he came out of the Abyss because she has a legal contract with a chain, the black unicorn Eques. Sharon and Break have a close relationship. She was the one that discovered Break in a fatal condition after he came out of the Abyss. When she was young, she used to call Break 'Xerx-nii', as he was like a big brother to her. She wants to be of use to him. She also looks a lot like her mother, Shelly Rainsworth. While Oz and co. were taken into the Cheshire Cat's dimension, Sharon was abducted by Echo under the orders of Vincent Nightray, who poisoned Sharon in order to blackmail Break into destroying the memories from the Tragedy of Sablier that Break attained from the Cheshire Cat. Despite Sharon protesting to Break to not destroy the memories, which took the form of the bell Cheshire wore around his neck, Break destroyed the memories in exchange for the poison's antidote. Sharon develops a queen complex when she drinks, which Oz strangely finds cool. She likes the concept of "love" and tries to teach Alice about it. In episode 20, she wanted Alice to call her "big sister." In the second DVD special, she tries to teach Alice "her status as a female." Also in episode 20, she beat Oz with a paper fan after Alice told her that she and Oz already kissed, later apologizing.

After Oz and co. return from Sablier, Sharon realizes Break still thinks of her as fragile. She then makes a resolution to be of more use to Break, and joins Oz, Gil, and Alice when they go to locate a seal encasing one of Jack's body parts. While at the location of the seal, the group is attacked and Sharon realizes she takes the power of her chain for granted. Since then she has decided that she is powerless but is determined to get stronger.

=== Xerxes Break ===
Xerxes Break (ザークシーズ = ブレイク, Zākushīzu Bureiku), more commonly referred to as Break, is a member of Pandora and a servant of the Rainsworth Dukedom. Break's appearance does not change from the ten-year gap between Oz entering and leaving the Abyss. He has a contract with the Mad Hatter. Break is often seen with a doll on his shoulder, which he calls Emily. He adores sweets and cakes. From the outside, Break seems like a carefree character, never serious and always smiling. When needs be, however, Break shows his dangerous and evil side. Reim tells Oz that Break has not always been the way he is now. Before, after losing his eye, he was a bitter and angry person, never smiling. However, through the kindness of Shelly, Sharon's mother, he began to open up. He has sworn absolute loyalty to Shelly.

Break has no left eye. He reveals that the Intention of the Abyss took it from him and that the Cheshire has it. Break's true motive is to find the truth behind what happened 100 years ago. He hates Vincent with a passion.

Rufus Barma reveals his real name to be Kevin Legnard. Break was originally a knight who served under the noble family Sinclair until they were mysteriously massacred for political reasons. His lord was killed during the incident while Break and the daughter of the lord were out. Break blamed himself for his carelessness, and became an illegal contractor with a chain named Albus the White Knight to try to change the past. When his clock made a full revolution, he was pulled into Abyss where he met the Intention of the Abyss and a young Vincent. The Intention of the Abyss once changed the past for Break. In return, Break was asked to fulfill her wish. Her wish was to not be the Will of the Abyss anymore and to help her save Alice, in the manga. Break then was sent to the Rainsworth house over 30 years later of his own time.

The changed past wasn't really what Break wanted. The Sinclair family was still murdered. According to Sheryl, the oldest daughter of the house was assassinated, which led the younger daughter to become an illegal contractor and got sent to Abyss after her Chain murdered the entire family. The political massacre did not happen and Break's lord lived for 4 years longer, but instead, the little girl who originally survived the incident died. Break blames himself for that. For one moment he also blamed the Intention of the Abyss, but he realizes that he was the one who asked for the past to be changed, and in reality, he really just wanted to erase his own guilt. In Retrace 42, it is shown that Break has lost his eyesight, causing him to be blind. It is later revealed, however, that Break has not gone completely blind' although he can no longer discern faces, he can make out general objects. When he and the others learned the truth of the Tragedy of Sablier, Break stole the earrings Rufus had taken from Sheryl earlier only to have them be stolen back and after hearing that Oz was in trouble, ran towards the direction of the sound of the chains breaking. He was later caught in a fight with Duke Barma, who cut off the power source of the Mad Hatter, causing Break to be captured by the Baskervilles. After some time, Reim sent power through the Rainsworth Gate's key, through which Mad Hatter is contracted, and gave Break enough strength to escape from the Baskervilles together with Sharon and Sheryl.

After entering the Abyss in order to stop Glen, Oz and Co. were quickly separated, and Break was warped into the salon leading to the Baskerville's Gate, where he encountered Glen and Vincent. After some fighting, Break saved Vincent from being killed by Glen, and used the last of his strength to pull Oz and the others into the dimension, which they couldn't have entered without the power of a Child of Misfortune. He dies shortly after Sharon's arrival.

Break is voiced by Toshihiko Seki (drama CD) and Akira Ishida (anime).

== Barma Dukedom ==
The Barma Dukedom is one of the Four Great Dukedoms, and are contracted to the black-winged Chain Dodo. Before the tragedy of Sablier, they were foreign nobility (exiled from their own country), but were chosen by Jack to be part of the Four Great Dukedoms because of his 'friendship' with the siblings Arthur and Miranda Barma.

=== Rufus Barma ===
Voiced by: Yūya Uchida

Rufus Barma (ルーファス = バルマ, Rūfasu Baruma) is the last of the four dukes. Rufus is known as the longest living duke and is a very knowledgeable person. He holds information on almost all topics and even knows people's personalities and is thus able to predict their reactions. He absolutely detests people changing without him knowing as then he would not have the most updated information. Oz and co. approach Rufus to seek information about the Tragedy of Sablier. Rufus first appears as a round man with a big mustache wearing a big teacup shaped hat. Later, after getting destroyed by Break, it is revealed that the real Rufus created that as an illusion. The real Rufus has long red hair, tired looking eyes and speaks in olden-day Japanese. He was sought by Oz in order to learn more about the Tragedy of Sablier, but instead, they learned about Break's past from him. Sheryl Rainsworth, Sharon's grandmother, is a childhood friend of Rufus and he seems to fear the wrath of the Rainsworth family's women, although in one of the omakes, he is seen entrusting a young Reim with a love letter to Sheryl, his first love. He discovers Arthur Barma's book and decodes it to find out that Jack divided up his body. It is revealed that his family is from another country. He has a contract with the Dodo.

Duke Barma later sided with the Baskervilles, injuring Sheryl and Break. After, he destroyed a pair of Sheryl's earrings, believed to be the key to the Rainsworth Gate, but in truth belonged to the Barma Gate, resulting in him unable to summon Dodo. Glen confronts him for his true aims, and with no choice, Duke Barma jumps off a cliff.

=== Reim Lunettes ===
Voiced by: Junichi Suwabe

Reim Lunettes (レイム = ルネット, Reimu Runetto) is a member of Pandora. He wears glasses and is a serious person. He is always used and made fun of by Break, Oscar or Vincent, much to his frustration. He accidentally discovers Oz's return from the Abyss. Reim is a rather honest person and is seen to be trusted by most of the Pandora members, and also by Break and Oz. He was put in charge of looking after Oz by Oscar. Rufus Barma is his master. Reim has a close friendship with Break, consoling him after Break loses his eyesight. Reim is a contractor, and that his Chain is March Hare, any powers it may have are said to be useless for fighting but what it is exactly has yet to be revealed. He and his team was attacked by Lily who kept him alive, at first because she wanted to have a contractor battle and then because she wanted to be his friend. Despite his qualms about a little girl being one of his enemies, he shot Lily in the head when she nonchalantly revealed that the Baskervilles would perform another massacre if Glen ordered it. He appeared to have been killed by Lily precipitating a fight between Break and the Baskervilles. But his ability is revealed to be "False Death" which gives him the appearance of a dead man fooling enemies. Reim's feelings on Lily are unresolved.

When Oz and the others left for the Abyss, he had intended to stay in the real world and protect Sheryl, but changed his mind and entered the Abyss as well, just in time to save Sharon from Lottie. He gives several reasons why they shouldn't waste time fighting each other, and formed a truce with the Baskervilles.

=== Miranda Barma ===
Miranda Barma (ミランダ = バルマ, Miranda Baruma) is the cloaked woman who speaks with a young Vincent on how to save his brother. She offers a way to save Gilbert from his death as Glen Baskerville's next body. She decides to teach Vincent the way to open the doors of the abyss. She planned the Tragedy of Sablier. She was shown to love decapitating heads and made a promise to Jack that if she was able to get him to see Lacie again he would in return give her Oswald's, Lacie's brother's, head. After she was killed by Oswald she was falling into the abyss and was turned into the chain Demios the Headhunter.

=== Arthur Barma ===
Arthur Barma (アーサー = バルマ, Āsā Baruma) is to be the sole witness to the Tragedy of Sablier. He later wrote a book that was discovered by Rufus Barma. It was revealed that he helped to divide Jack's body into five fragments to create the curse to prevent Glen's consciousness to wake up. However within the last few pages of the book he wrote heavily coded truths about the Tragedy of Sablier. How Jack was the true cause of the Tragedy of Sablier and that he was no hero.

== Residents of Baskerville ==
=== Glen Baskerville ===
Glen Baskerville (グレン = バスカヴィル, Guren Basukaviru) was the head of the Baskerville family 100 years ago. Glen might never been a human but a "spirit" that is the Baskerville's head and must continue for eternity thus the necessity of having new bodies through the five chains with black feathers. He reveals to Jack, that his transfer is similar to reincarnation, that he transfer his spirit to another body not retaining his current memories, while past personalities of Glen are able to share the same mind and even take over the current body. Glen's next body was supposed to be Gilbert with Raven as the chosen Chain. It is soon revealed that Glen is merely a title for head of the Baskervilles.

=== Levi ===
Levi (レヴィ, Revy) was the head of Baskerville household before Oswald and is the father of Alice and The Will of The Abyss. Levi was shown to be sarcastic and find things to be fun in most ways. He has strange way of showing his humorous side. Although, he can be serious when needed. He took a quick interest in Jack and gave Jack the way to the secret passage to enter the Baskerville mansion whenever he wanted to. It was also revealed that he had taken care of both Oswald and Lacie since they were children. Before Lacie was cast into the abyss, he impregnated her as part of his experiment to uncover a way for people to control the power of the Abyss, and that he would do this by supplying the Core of the Abyss a human vessel. After giving his last Chain, Jabberwock to Oswald and the latter becoming the next Glen, he confronted Jack and revealed everything about the reason why Lacie was cast into the Abyss and left everything to Jack to finish what he had started with his experiment, knowing that he wouldn't live long to watch the result as his body was soon going to become the Chain Humpty Dumpty. He met up with Jack once more before his death and explained to him about the chains that held the world together and that without them the world would fall into the Abyss.

=== Oswald ===
Voiced by: Kishō Taniyama

Oswald (オズワルド, Ozuwarudo) was Lacie's older brother and Jack's supposed only best friend. He was the next Glen after Levi. According to Lottie, Oswald (who was already known as Glen at the time) gave the impression that he liked being alone and was difficult to approach. He was also shown to be an honest person, revealing his interest in Jack to the point that it made his skin crawl directly in front of his face. This made Jack at first, afraid of him because he felt that he could see his true nature, though later they eventually becoming good friends. At the day of the ceremony he officially became Glen, he sent Lacie to the Abyss with his own hands, and since then trying to atone for killing his sister. Jack and Oswald made a musical pocket watch together. Oswald wrote the melody for it while Jack crafted it. The piece he wrote is called "Lacie" name after his sister as it was the tune she would hum often. it is his head which is sealed on the sealing stones and that Miranda Barma has an obsession for his head. When Jack opened the Gate of the Abyss using Vincent within the Baskerville Mansion during Gilbert's first Transfer Ceremony, Oswald halted everything and told the Baskervilles to kill everyone so that the humans could return to this world after a 100 years cycle instead of turning into Chains. However it was Cheshire that manages to put a dent into that plan and later engages Oz. After becoming the new Glen, Leo wasn't stable enough to aim straight at set goals, causing Oswald to take over the body.

=== Lacie ===
Lacie (レイシー, Reishī) was a member of the Baskerville household and Oswald's younger sister. The melody that Oswald composed was named after her. She died as a sacrifice made to the Abyss. The tombstone where Oz found the pocket watch is her tomb. She resembles Alice greatly, sans her red eyes of misfortune and darker colored hair. She found Jack on the streets after getting upset with Oswald, so she traveled with him to kill time. She went back after the Baskervilles found and delivered Oswald's message that he apologized, leaving Jack one of her earrings and told him to find her by remembering the name Baskerville. She is later revealed to have returned Jack's feelings because he was so faithful to her. She's rather eccentric, despising common sense because according to her, one has to look at the world from different angles to appreciate it. She is shown to be rather sadistic, as when she killed people who intended to sell her in the same manner as the Will of the Abyss. Levi had impregnated her before she was cast into the Abyss and she had given birth to twins; Alice and the Will of the Abyss. She is also responsible for the creation of Oz as she brought the Core of the Abyss one twin stuffed rabbit who gained a personality and whom Alice would later name 'Oz'.

=== Lottie ===
Voiced by: Megumi Toyoguchi

Charlotte "Lottie" (ロッティ, Lotti) is a bubbly girl with pink hair that kidnaps Oz at Lutwidge. She was a participant in the Tragedy of Sablier and killed many under orders. She served the Baskerville house and had feelings for Glen 100 years ago. Her real name is Charlotte, but Jack gave her the nickname Lottie after they met. Lottie can't forgive Jack for killing his supposedly best friend and object of her affection and thus is targeting Oz to talk to Jack. Her main objective was to find their master Glen, and to find out what actually happened on the night of the Tragedy of Sablier. Although she was one of the participants, she acted upon orders, and knew nothing behind the scenes. Hence why they approached Jack for the answers. She controls a chain called "Leon". Break has begun a "friendship" with Lottie. Retrace 51 implies that Lottie, along with the other Baskervilles, is immortal, as they are "special beings chosen by Abyss." It appears the Baskervilles are more like Chains than humans at this point which makes them susceptible to Mad Hatter's power. After encountering Reim in the Abyss, Lottie decides it is her job as Glen's vassal to pull him from the wrong path and joins forces with Sharon and Reim.

=== Fang ===
Voiced by: Takayuki Kondō

Fang (ファング, Fangu) has spiky hair and a tattoo down the left side of his face. He was also a participant in the Tragedy of Sablier. Fang speaks politely and is the most rational of the trio. He wields a large blade. Retrace 51 implies that Fang, along with the other Baskervilles, is immortal, as they are "special beings chosen by Abyss." Despite this, in Retrace 56, Break stabs him through the stomach and he dies by dissipating.

=== Doug ===
Voiced by: Hiroshi Shirokuma

Doug (ダグ, Dagu) is another member of the trio. It is vaguely shown under his hood that he has a tattoo opposite of Fang's on the right side of his face. Not much has been revealed about him. Retrace 51 implies that Doug, along with the other Baskervilles, is immortal, as they are "special beings chosen by Abyss."

=== Lily ===
Lily (リリィ, Rirī) is the latest Baskerville to be released from the door of the abyss that the Baskervilles own. A little girl that cries a lot. She controls a chain known as Bandersnatch that is a canine chain. Her mentality goes from an innocent child to a raging psychopath in seconds. In Retrace 51, it is show after being shot in the head by Reim, that she cannot die (she had also revealed how one becomes a Baskerville). She desires Reim's friendship and is deeply hurt by his rejection, but was happy to see him alive, a big smile on her face when he called out her name. However, that split second distraction almost got her killed and killed Fang who threw her out of the way and took the fatal blow himself. She also hates Gilbert for having Raven as his chain. Later on, she became real "friends" with Reim and took the responsibility of protecting Reim and Sharon from chains released through random gates.

== Other characters ==
=== Chains ===
B-Rabbit (血染めの黒ウサギ (ビーラビット), Chizome no kuro usagi / Blood stained black rabbit (Bī-Rabitto, lit. B Rabbit))
Also known as Alice and is contracted to Oz. The 'B' stands for both 'bloody' and 'black'. B-rabbit is the most powerful chain in the Abyss and resembles an anthropomorphic rabbit with black fur, red pupils and fangs wielding a giant scythe when released. B-Rabbit also can utilize several large steel chains with spiked tips that can be used to both attack and bind targets. When she is not in battle, she takes the form of a girl with a red coat with white diamond design and white boots. Oz, not Alice, is the true B-Rabbit, and that he was originally a small stuffed rabbit doll that Alice played with while imprisoned before the Tragedy of Sablier. Oz at some point was transformed by the Abyss into a chain and was contracted to Jack whose body Oz used as a vessel.
Raven (鴉 (レイヴン), Karasu / Crow, Raven (Reibun, lit. Raven))
Gilbert's chain. Previously Glen's chain. Sealed by the Nightray family and eventually tamed by Gilbert. Can use teleportation at a great strain to the user. It is shown in Retrace 45 that Raven remembers Gilbert from the past, saying that he has seen him three times. The first time he disturbed him, the second time he came to visit, and the time when he made the contract. He also said that he'd be bound to Gilbert's left arm again.
Eques (一角獣 (エクエス), Ikkakujū / Unicorn (Ekuesu, lit. Equus))
Sharon's chain. Eques is in the shape of a black unicorn and is often used by Sharon for data collection. It has the power to warp between places and dimensions, taking people with it. Sharon can also conceal Eques inside a person's shadow, allowing her to see and hear what they see and hear and allow them to converse over large distances. Sharon mentions that although Eques is meant for espionage, it doesn't mean that it is not powerful.
Mad Hatter (イカレ帽子屋 (マッド ハッター), Ikare bōshiya / Mad hatter (Maddo Hattā, lit. Mad Hatter))
Break's chain. It resembles the "Alice in Wonderland" character (Mad Hatter) but gives off a more sinister feel. Mad Hatter resembles a giant top hat with flowery decorations, under which is one big eye. It has the power to reject and destroy the power of the Abyss and exists for the purpose of killing other chains. When Break uses its power to a large extent, he is seen coughing up blood, but only because his previous identity, Kevin Regnard, had already made an illegal contract with Albus, putting more strain on the Break's body.
Dormouse (眠り鼠 (ヤマネ), Nemuri nezumi / Sleeping mouse, Dormouse (Yamane))
Vincent's chain. It resembles the dormouse of Alice in Wonderland, but much bigger. Yamane has a toy-like tuner on its back and has stitch-closed eyes. It is always seen asleep and also makes its contractor, Vincent, sleepy. This chain enables Vincent to put people to sleep after a few seconds of direct contact.
Cheshire (チェシャ猫 (チェシャ), Chesha neko / Cheshire cat (Chesha, lit. Cheshire))
A chain that lives in a dimension created from Alice's memories. He resembles a human form of the Cheshire Cat from Alice in Wonderland. Cheshire was actually Alice's pet cat from 100 years ago. The bell around his neck is the 'truth' from 100 years ago, later taken by Break. The Cheshire cat is a unique chain in that he doesn't need a contractor in order to leave the Abyss (since his residence isn't in the Abyss in the first place). Originally believed to be a fervent servant of the Intention of the Abyss, it later turns out that he is trying to protect Alice's memories that she abandoned, in order to prevent her from suffering pain when she recalls them. Break mentions that Cheshire's eye was his. It is revealed in Break's memory of meeting the Will of the Abyss that Vincent had removed Cheshire's eyes 100 years ago, killing him. Cheshire also has only one eye, since the Abyss only took one of Break's eyes when it showed his memories. Cheshire can also be connected to "Through the Looking Glass" as Alice's cat 'Kitty'. Kitty is black and has a ribbon tied around his neck. He makes a return surprising even Oswald. He did not die but had been in dimensions trying to recover his wounds.
Cheshire is voiced by Kappei Yamaguchi.
Jabberwock (ジャバウォック, Jabawokku, lit. Jabberwock)
Glen Baskerville's (and later, Leo's) Chain, shaped like a black bird-insect-like creature with large insane-looking eyes, he's reckless and aggressive but responds faithfully to Glen's commands.
Glen's Bird-Like Chains
Glen controlled five chains, the jabberwock, the Dodo, the Owl, the Griffin, and Raven. It is assumed that Glen's chains were divided among the Four Dukes to watch over. The Nightray watched over Raven, and Vessalius, the Griffin. In retrace 43, it is shown that the Barma house holds the Dodo while the Rainsworth holds the Owl.
Leon (リオン, Rion, lit. Leon))
Lotti's chain, shaped like a blue lion with a crown and small wings.
Bandersnatch (バンダースナッチ, Bandāsunacchi, lit. Bandersnatch))
Lily's chain, shaped like a black dog with numerous wispy tails and has a tendency to kill humans against Lily's will when hungry. First appears in retrace 49.
March Hare (三月ウサギ（マーチヘアー）, Sangatsu Usagi/Māchi Heā, lit. March Hare))
Reim's chain as revealed in retrace 51. It is known as "more useless in combat than a Card", as expressed by Break. Its ability is "false death", where it puts the contractor into a feigned state of death for a certain amount of time. It doesn't heal wounds during this state, either, and it is unknown when the person will awake from the power.
Humpty Dumpty (ハンプティダンプティ, Hanputi Danputi, lit. Humpty Dumpty))
A chain that has the power to make people forget painful memories, and believed to be the head hunter. It is revealed by Rufus Barma that this chain can split its contract with several contractors to slow down the rate of the illegal contractor seal rotation. It is also assumed that all the children of the House of Fianna have a contract with it. Elliot is in an illegal contract with the head Humpty Dumpty it is also shown that it was Levi Baskerville after his death.
Queen of Hearts (Demios) (クイーン・オブ・ザ・ハート（ディミオス）, Kuīn obu za Hāto/Dimiosu, lit. Queen of Hearts))
Vincent Nightray's second chain that attacks by beheading its enemies. Its form is skeletal with the head of a goat and large wings. This chain is responsible for the first beheading of the Nightray household as well as the incident at the second sealing stone. Also, Humpty Dumpty, originally thought to be the headhunter, only mimics the Queen of Hearts. Demios is Miranda Barma from a hundred years ago when she drifted into the abyss and turned into the chain.
Doldee
Doldee is a large female chain wrapped in chains with a stitched mouth and hollow eyes contracted with Zwei. She has the power to turn people into mind controlled slaves. Through Zwei's life, Doldee had been creating disposable personalities called "Doldum" to prevent Zwei from breaking apart, which would, after too much contact with the outer world, would start fading apart, calling for the creation of a new personality.

=== Other ===
Philippe West (フィリップ = ウェスト, Firippu Wesuto)
Voiced by: Kumiko Higa
Philippe is a young child from a wealthy family, though without a mother and father. Oz saved Philippe from some bullies, and while talking to him saw a reflection of himself in Philippe, particularly that of his father. Phillipe was then attacked by Echo, who was in pursuit of an illegal contractor. Echo took Phillipe and was about to chase after his father, the illegal contractor, and use him as a hostage. However, Oz managed to interfere with the process. Philippe's father made an illegal contract to try to bring his wife back to life but lost control and was eventually killed by Vincent on grounds that he was about to kill Oz.
After the death of his father, Philippe was taken to the Nightray's orphanage at Sablier. There, Oz meets him again. Oz tries to apologize for not being able to bring his father back. Philippe denies that his father is dead by saying that he has received a letter from his father. He is later seen talking on the phone with his father, although the phone cord is shown to be severed, leading one to suspect that Philippe is mentally unstable. He is seen again in Retrace 52 at the party taking place at Isla Yura's place when he shows up with Alice wearing a cloak similar to that of the Baskervilles. When Oz and Alice ask him why he's there, he tells them that the kids from the orphanage are participating in a 'play' about the Tragedy of Sablier. He and the other House of Fianna children are contracted to the Chain Humpty Dumpty.
The Head Hunter (首狩りの女王, Kubikari no Joō, lit. Headhunting Queen)
The Head hunter, also known as Humpty Dumpty, is a mysterious killer and a Chain who had targeted the Nightrays in the past, killing Elliot's elder siblings. Humpty Dumpty made its appearance known in Retrace 44 killing everyone in the mansion. The head hunter then proceeds in releasing the seal trapping Glen's soul. Humpty Dumpty has connections with the Baskervilles, as he is the body which Glen Baskerville had before his new one. When Glen transferred from that body, the body became Humpty Dumpty. His motives are unknown. The head hunter seems to have a connection with Isla Yura and the religious cult Yura leads. It was then later mentioned by Glen that the Head hunter was actually the previous Glen's body. (He said, "once my soul leaves my body, it will turn into a chain." and that "Humpty Dumpty is the transformed body of the previous Glen.")
In the end, it was revealed that Humpty Dumpty's role was nothing more than that of an imitator of the true Head Hunter, Demios, also known as The Queen of Hearts who was once Miranda Barma.
Isla Yura (イスラ = ユラ, Isura Yura)
Isla Yura is first seen as a worshiper of Jack Vessalius. In Retrace 54, he is revealed to be behind the massacre at his house, in an attempt to recreate the Tragedy of Sablier. He believes that the Abyss is a place of happiness and the real tragedy of the Tragedy of Sablier was that the whole world did not enter the Abyss. In Retrace 56, it is shown that he truly doesn't believe this and is only manipulating the people in the occult for an ulterior motive.

== See also ==
- List of Pandora Hearts chapters
- List of Pandora Hearts episodes
