= Justice Lacy =

Justice Lacy may refer to:

- Benjamin W. Lacy (1839–1895), associate justice of the Supreme Court of Virginia
- Elizabeth B. Lacy (born 1945), associate justice of the Supreme Court of Virginia
- Thomas J. Lacy (c. 1806–1849), associate justice of the Arkansas Supreme Court

== See also ==
- Lacy (surname)
- Lacy (disambiguation)
