= Lacey =

Lacey may refer to:

== People ==
=== Surname ===
- Al Lacey (born 1942), Canadian politician
- Andrew Lacey (1887–1946), Australian politician
- Bill Lacey (American football) (born 1971), American football player and coach
- Bill Lacey (footballer) (1889–1969), Irish footballer
- Bob Lacey (born 1953), American baseball player
- Bruce Lacey (1927–2016), British inventor
- Catherine Lacey (1904–1979), English actress
- Catherine Lacey (author) (born 1985), American writer
- Denzil Lacey (born 1990), Irish radio presenter
- Deon Lacey (born 1990), American football player
- Dermot Lacey (born 1960), Irish politician
- Des Lacey (1925–1974), Irish footballer
- Dinny Lacey (1890–1923), Irish Republican
- Edmund Lacey (died 1455), English bishop
- Edward S. Lacey (1835–1916), American politician
- Francis Lacey (1859–1946), English cricketer
- Frederick Bernard Lacey (1920–2017), American judge
- Genevieve Lacey (born 1972), Australian recorder player
- Ian Lacey (born 1984), Australian rugby league player
- Ingrid Lacey (born 1958), British actress
- Isaac Lacey (1776–1844), New York politician
- James Harry Lacey (1917–1989), RAF officer and WW2 flying ace
- Janet Lacey (1903–1988), English charity director and philanthropist
- Jesse Lacey (born 1978), American musician
- Jim Lacey (1934–2008), Australian zoo manager
- Joe Lacey (born 2007), Australian soccer player
- John F. Lacey (1841–1913), American politician
- John Lacey (general) (1755–1814), American military officer
- Lionel Lacey (born 1958), pen name of Lionel Fogarty, Aboriginal Australian poet and activist
- Margaret Lacey (1910–1988), Welsh actress
- Martin Lacey (born 1947), British animal trainer, owner of the Great British Circus
- Martin Lacey Jr. (born 1977), son of Martin Lacey, British animal trainer
- Michael Lacey (editor), American editor
- Michael Lacey (mathematician) (born 1959), American mathematician
- Michael Pearse Lacey (1916–2014), Canadian bishop
- Nicola Lacey (born 1958), British legal scholar
- Rebecca Lacey (born 1969), British actress
- Richard Lacey (born 1953), British air marshal
- Rob Lacey (1962–2006), English author
- Robert Lacey (born 1944), British historian and biographer
- Ronald Lacey (1935–1991), English actor
- Rubin Lacey (1901–1972), American musician
- Sam Lacey (1948–2014), American basketball player
- Sergeant Lacey, American military interrogator
- Simon Lacey (born 1975), English cricketer
- Tiff Lacey (born 1965), British singer
- Tori Lacey (born 1973), British weather forecaster
- Tyrel Lacey (born 1986), American soccer player
- V'Keon Lacey (born 1988), American football player
- William Lacey (born 1973), British conductor

=== First name ===
- Lacey (wrestler) (born 1983), American professional wrestler
- Lacey Baldwin Smith (1922–2013), American historian
- Lacey Brown (born 1985), American Idol finalist
- Lacey Chabert (born 1982), American actress
- Lacey Dancer (born 1948), American author
- Lacey Eden (born 2002), American ice hockey player
- Lacey Evans (born 1990), American professional wrestler
- Lacey Fletcher (1985–2022), American murder victim
- Lacey Fosburgh (1942–1993), American journalist and author
- Lacey Hearn (1881–1969), American runner
- Lacey Robert Johnson (1854–1915), Canadian engineer
- Lacey Nymeyer (born 1985), American swimmer
- Lacey Putney (1928–2017), American politician
- Lacey Schwimmer (born 1988), American dancer
- Lacey Sturm (born 1981), American singer
- Lacey Turner (born 1988), English actress
- Lacey Von Erich (born 1986), American professional wrestler
- Lacey Wildd (born 1968), American model and actress

== Places ==
- Lacey, Washington
- Lacey Green (disambiguation), a number of places in the UK
- Lacey Township, New Jersey

== Other ==
- Lacey Act of 1900, conservation law in the United States that prohibits trade in wildlife, fish, and plants
- "Lacey" (Once Upon a Time), a 2013 television episode

== See also ==
- Lace (disambiguation)
- Laci (disambiguation)
- Lacie (disambiguation)
- Lacy (disambiguation)
