= Love Get Chu =

Japanese mobile phone visual novel and anime series

- Promotional image for Love Get Chu

ラブゲッチュ (Rabu Getchu)
- Genre: Romantic comedy
- Video game
- Developer: ARiKO System
- Genre: Visual novel
- Platform: Mobile phone
- Anime television series

Love Get Chu: Miracle Seiyū Hakusho
- Directed by: Mitsuhiro Tōgō
- Produced by: Marie Shiori
- Written by: Fuzi (1–13); Naruhisa Arakawa (14–25)
- Music by: Yuki Matsūra
- Studio: Radix Ace Entertainment
- Original network: TV Tokyo, TVA, TVO, AT-X
- Original run: April 5, 2006 – September 27, 2006
- Episodes: 25

Love Get Chu (ラブゲッチュ, Rabu Getchu) is a Japanese mobile phone visual novel created by ARiKO System about a group of five girls trying to become voice actresses. An anime adaptation entitled Love Get Chu: The Miracle Book of Voice Actors (ラブゲッチュ 〜ミラクル声優白書〜, Rabu Getchu ~Mirakuru Seiyū Hakusho~) aired in Japan on TV Tokyo between April 4 and September 27, 2006, containing twenty-five episodes.

== Plot ==
Love Get Chu is a story involving five girls that come to a training school named Lambda Eight (Λ8) to be able to fulfill their common goal of becoming voice actresses. Eventually, they all manage to get into the school, though first they must go through with the training.

== Characters ==
Momoko Ichihara (市原 桃子, Ichihara Momoko)
Voiced by: Megumi Takamoto
The main protagonist, she is a strange girl who carries around a small stuffed rabbit called Usamaru-san and speaks to it frequently, often while in public. She wanted to become a voice actress to meet Minato Ichinose, her favorite actor who she always wished would marry her but later in the episodes, she started to have feelings for Atari and gets jealous of Yurika.
Rinka Suzuki (鈴木 りんか, Suzuki Rinka)
Voiced by: Ryōko Shintani
She is an amateur voice actress, though it is unsure why she chose this profession. She seems to have a quiet, shy personality who doesn't speak out much.
Yurika Sasaki (佐々木 祐理花, Sasaki Yurika)
Voiced by: Yurika Ochiai
She likes anime so much that she wanted to become a voice actress. She has a very hyperactive personality and is also very confident in herself. As a voice actress, she dreams to be special and noticed among people. Ultimately, she wants to rise as a famous actress that appears on the covers of magazines. She's jealous of Momoko for living with Atari.
Tsubasa Onodera (小野寺 翼, Onodera Tsubasa)
Voiced by: Azuma Sakamoto
A tomboy girl who prefers to be the voice for boys instead of girls.
Amane Ōhara (大原 天音, Ōhara Amane)
Voiced by: Maria Yamamoto
She couldn't find good enough work as an actress, so tried her luck as being a voice actress. She seems to be a wealthy person who even has a maid named Kiyoka follow her around.
Atari Maeda (真栄田 アタリ, Maeda Atari)
Voiced by: Naozumi Takahashi
He is a young anime artist working who meets Momoko one day on a train, though later he starts living in the same group home as her. He started liking Momoko for her unique personality and eventually loved it.
Runa Narita (成田 留奈, Narita Runa)
Voiced by: Yuka Imai
The manager of the group home where Momoko and Atari (among several others) live while in Tokyo. She has a nice personality though often gets her tenants to do work for her.

== Theme song ==
Opening Song - Moonflower (Yuri Kasahara) Ending Song - Ai no Uta (Shoko Haida)

== Episodes ==
No.	Title	Original release date
1	"Momoko, She'll Be A Voice Actress!"; Transliteration: "Momoko, Seiyū ni Narimasu!" (Japanese: 桃子、声優になりますっ!)	April 4, 2006
Momoko goes to Tokyo to achieve her dream of becoming a voice actress.
2	"Momoko, A New Life Starts!"; Transliteration: "Momoko, Shinseikatsu Sutāto desu!" (Japanese: 桃子、新生活スタートですっ!)	April 11, 2006
After becoming a voice actress trainee, Momoko's new life begins.
3	"Momoko, A Part-Time Job Starts!"; Transliteration: "Momoko, Arubaito Hajimemasu!" (Japanese: 桃子、アルバイト始めますっ!)	April 18, 2006
Momoko finds living in Tokyo hard as she has no money. She tries to find a suitable part-time job.
4	"Momoko, A Surprise Stage Debut!?"; Transliteration: "Momoko, Ikinari Sutēji Debyū desu!?" (Japanese: 桃子、いきなりステージデビューですっ!?)	April 25, 2006
Momoko and her friends help out in a stage debut, but unexpectedly, an accident appears.
5	"Rinka, Anyhow Run!"; Transliteration: "Rinka, Tonikaku Hashirimasu!" (Japanese: りんか、とにかく走りますっ!)	May 2, 2006
Rinka, one of Momoko's friend, loses confidence in being a voice actress.
6	"Tsubasa, Will Be A Girl!"; Transliteration: "Tsubasa, Onna no Ko ni Narimasu!" (Japanese: 翼、女の子になりますっ!)	May 9, 2006
Tsubasa is a tomboy who wants a male role as a voice actress. During an event, Tsubasa learns what it feels like when a girl is going to a date in order to practice a female role. She goes on a date with her senpai who she has a crush on.
7	"Yurika, This Love Is Alive!"; Transliteration: "Yurika, Kono Koi ni Ikimasu!" (Japanese: 祐理花、この恋に生きますっ!)	May 16, 2006
Yurika remembers her promise with Atari back when they were little kids, when Atari pinky-promised Yurika that when she became a voice actor, he'd draw the animations. When Yurika finds out that Atari has already had his debut in animating, she rushes to have her own debut, leading her to be tricked by a fake company and quitting Lambda 8. Momoko, Atari and Daimon find Yurika, in a bathing suit being harassed but saves her in the end. Momoko finds out Yurika might be in love with Atari.
8	"Amane, Let Me Oppose!?"; Transliteration: "Amane, Hankō Sasete Itadakimasu!?" (Japanese: 天音、反抗させていただきますっ!)	May 23, 2006
Amane's father forbids her to continue on training to become a voice actor and takes her home. Momoko along with the rest of the girls and Kiyoka try helping Amane to escape, and in the end Amane's father realizes that voice acting is just as good as acting and he lets her continue on training.
9	"Momoko, Something's Wrong!"; Transliteration: "Momoko, Nanka Hen desu!" (Japanese: 桃子、何か変ですっ!)	May 30, 2006
Momoko is invited to practise for the Special Promotion with her idol Minato but because she knew that Yurika and Atari were going on a date on the same day, she becomes jealous and doesn't pay attention during her practice with Minato. Back at the group home, Runa tells Momoko that Momoko's in love with Atari even though Momoko won't be able to prove that to herself yet.
10	"Momoko, Strategy Succeeds Step Up!?"; Transliteration: "Momoko, Sakusen Seikō Steppu Appu desu!?" (Japanese: 桃子、作戦成功ステップアップですっ!?)	June 6, 2006
Amane was declined from her job and was asked to instead act as one of the characters of "Child Girls" in a promotional act. Momoko and the others were also asked to be Amane's supportive characters on stage. When things go wrong, Momoko uses her adlib skills to save the show!
11	"Momoko, Wins Against Senior!"; Transliteration: "Momoko, Senpai ni Kachimasu!" (Japanese: 桃子、先輩に勝ちますっ!)	June 13, 2006
Momoko and the others are given the opportunity to try out as the main character in an anime. They all practise how to say the lines and Momoko wins the part. But in the end, the company cancels because the leader of the company is a fan of Yuumi and wanted Yuumi to do the part at all cause.
12	"Momoko, Tries Her Best At Her First Job!"; Transliteration: "Momoko, Hatsu Shigoto Ganbacchaimasu!" (Japanese: 桃子、初仕事がんばっちゃいますっ!)	June 27, 2006
While everyone else has a job, Momoko has none until she was asked to play as "Chiiko" in "Child Girls". Due to it being her first job, she was nervous for being the only rookie in the studio. She was corrected many times and was hopeless until Minato tells her that everyone started off as a rookie. Momoko realizes that she should be happy for the opportunity and keep trying so she took a lot of retakes until they were happy. Meanwhile, Atari also was given his debut - to draw for Child Girls!
13	"We, Will Be Idols!!"; Transliteration: "Watashitachi, Aidoru Yarimasu!!" (Japanese: わたしたち、アイドルやりますっ!!)	July 4, 2006
Lambda 8 is going bankrupt, so to fix that, they assembled Momoko, Amane, Yurika, Tsubasa and Rinka to become the "Sister x Sisters"! Before the performance, things go wrong as people assumed that the Sister x Sisters were little sister characters, not Nuns, so Momoko and the team create a way to work it like usual. It pulls off, the show goes well and Lambda 8 stays in business.
14	"Momoko, Idol At Full Speed!"; Transliteration: "Momoko, Aidoru Masshigura desu!" (Japanese: 桃子、アイドルまっしぐらですっ!)	July 11, 2006
15	"Momoko, Is It Alright To Remain This Way?"; Transliteration: "Momoko, Konomama Itte, Iin desu...ka?" (Japanese: 桃子、このままいって、いいんです...か?)	July 18, 2006
16	"Momoko, Goes For Broke!"; Transliteration: "Momoko, Atatte Kudakeru desu!" (Japanese: 桃子、当たって砕けろですっ!)	July 25, 2006
17	"Momoko, Disagreeing Love!"; Transliteration: "Momoko, Surechigai no Koi desu!" (Japanese: 桃子、すれ違いの恋ですっ!)	August 1, 2006
18	"Momoko, In Any Case Laugh!"; Transliteration: "Momoko, Tonikaku Warau Shikanai desu!" (Japanese: 桃子、とにかく笑うしかないですっ!)	August 15, 2006
19	"Momoko, It's Already Over!"; Transliteration: "Momoko, Mō Oshimai desu!" (Japanese: 桃子、もうおしまいですっ!)	August 22, 2006
20	"Momoko, Roaming Around!"; Transliteration: "Momoko, Samayoi Makuri desu!" (Japanese: 桃子、さまよいまくりですっ!)	August 29, 2006
21	"Momoko, Advance to the Next Stage!!"; Transliteration: "Momoko, Kachinokotte Misemasu!!" (Japanese: 桃子、勝ち残ってみせますっ!!)	September 5, 2006
22	"Momoko, Falling in Love on an Uninhabited Island!"; Transliteration: "Momoko, Mujintō de Ai ni Narimasu!" (Japanese: 桃子、無人島で愛になりますっ!)	September 12, 2006
23	"Momoko, Fly Towards the Future!"; Transliteration: "Momoko, Mirai e Habatakimasu!" (Japanese: 桃子、未来へ羽ばたきますっ!)	September 19, 2006
24	"Momoko, Finally Doing It!!"; Transliteration: "Momoko, Tsui ni Yarimasu!!" (Japanese: 桃子、ついにやりますっ!!)	September 19, 2006
25	"Momoko, Strange Story..."Search for the Lie!" "The Manager's and Runa's Secret...""; Transliteration: "Momoko, Kimyō na Monogatari desu..."Nise Kiyo ka o Sagase!" "Kanrinin / Runa-san no Himitsu..."" (Japanese: 桃子、奇妙な物語です...「偽きよかを探せ!」「管理人·留奈さんの秘密...」)	September 26, 2006
