= Antonio Lacy =

Spanish doctor (born 1957)

Dr Antonio M. de Lacy Fortuny (born February 13, 1957, in Palma de Mallorca, Spain) is a Spanish doctor. He is Director of Instituto Quirúrgico Lacy at Quirónsalud.

== Biography ==
=== Education ===
- 1980 MD in Medicine and Surgery. Medical School (Universitat de Barcelona)
- 1987 Specialist in General Surgery (Hospital Clínic de Barcelona)
- 1988 Ph.D. in Medicine and Surgery: "Distal Spleno-Renal Anastomosis through the Retroperitoneum. A Study of Long-Term Haemodynamic Alterations". Excellent Cum Laude Distinction (Universitat de Barcelona)

=== Postgraduate Training ===
- Emory University (Atlanta)
- Pacific Presbyterian Hospital (San Francisco)
- Cleveland Clinic (Cleveland)
- Mount Sinai Hospital (New York City)
- Cornell University (New York State)

=== Professional career ===
- 1983-1987 – Surgery Internist: 2nd University Surgery Clinic. Hospital Clínic i Provincial de Barcelona.
- 1988 – Surgery Associate: Surgery Subdepartment. General and Digestive Surgery Service. Hospital Clínic i Provincial de Barcelona.
- 1996-2001 - Senior Specialist: General and Digestive Surgery Service. Institut de Malalties Digestives. Hospital Clínic i Provincial de Barcelona.
- 1998-2003 – Associate Professor of Surgery and Surgical Specialities: Surgery Department. Medical School, Universitat de Barcelona.
- 2001 – Surgery Consultant: General and Digestive Surgery Service. Institut de Malalties Digestives. Hospital Clínic i Provincial de Barcelona.
- 2002 – Member of the Advisory Board to the Medical Management at the Hospital Clínic de Barcelona.
- 2002 – Head of Department at the Gastrointestinal Surgery Department. Institut de Malalties Digestives I Metabòliques. Hospital Clínic de Barcelona.
- 2003 – Professor of Surgery and Surgical Specialities. Surgery Department. Medical School, Universitat de Barcelona.
- 2007 – Head of Service at the Gastrointestinal Surgery Service. Institut de Malalties Digestives i Metabòliques, Hospital Clínic de Barcelona.
- 2007-2009 – President of EAES (European Association for Endoscopic Surgery).

== Research ==
- Laparoscopic surgery (gastroesophageal reflux disease, achalasia, oesophagus and stomach tumours, diverticular disease, inflammatory bowel disease – Crohn's disease and ulcerative colitis –, colorectal cancer, colonic bowel polyposis, liver surgery, gall bladder and bile duct surgery, pancreas tumours, etc.) He has performed various new procedures: the first laparoscopic and thoracoscopy approach to oesophageal cancer, the first laparoscopic approach to live kidney donation, etc.
- NOTES (Natural Orifice Transluminal Endoscopic Surgery) and SILS (Single Incision Laparoscopic Surgery). He has performed transgastric cholecystectomy, anti-transoral oesophageal-gastric reflux techniques, transvaginal sigmoidectomy, transvaginal tubular gastroplasty, cholecystectomy and obesity surgery – sleeve gastrectomy, taking a SILS approach.
- Oncological Surgery (colon and rectal cancer, esophageal and stomach cancer, metastasis treatment – surgical resection, radiofrequency, etc. –, pancreas cancer, liver tumours).
- Obesity Surgery and Development of Surgical Programme for Type-2 Diabetes and Metabolic Syndrome, as part of international working groups for the development of new techniques.
- Dr Lacy is also a pioneer in use of the Cecil Approach (simultaneous robotic transabdominal and transanal approach to removal of rectal cancer).
- He is a Founding Member of AIS (Advances in Surgery) Channel, a leading global educational platform providing training and networking for surgeons.

== Publications ==
- Dr Lacy has 175 publications under his name, with a global Impact Factor of 454 and a Hirsch index of 32.
