= Lacy Hunt =

American economist

Lacy Harris Hunt is an economist and Executive Vice President of Hoisington Investment Management Company (HIMCO). He is vice-chairman of HIMCO's strategic investment policy committee and also Chief Economist for the Wasatch Hoisington Treasury Bond Fund. He has authored two books, A Time to Be Rich and Dynamics of Forecasting: Financial Cycles, Theory and Techniques, and has had articles published in Barron’s, The Wall Street Journal, The New York Times, The Journal of Finance, the Financial Analysts Journal, the Journal of Portfolio Management, among other publication outlets. He received the Abramson Award from the National Association for Business Economics for “outstanding contributions in the field of business economics.”
