= Len Lacy =

American politician (1900–1998)

John Len Lacy

Louisiana State Representative from Bienville Parish
- In office 1964–1968
- Preceded by: C. L. McCrary
- Succeeded by: Edgerton L. "Bubba" Henry

Member of Bienville Parish School Board
- In office January 6, 1931 – 1964

Personal details
- Born: September 8, 1900 Castor, Bienville Parish; Louisiana, US
- Died: June 7, 1998 (aged 97) Monroe, Ouachita Parish; Louisiana
- Resting place: New Ebenezer Cemetery in Castor, Louisiana
- Party: Democratic
- Spouse: Sallie Williams Lacy (1905–1999)
- Children: Doris Lacy Barnes of Newellton in Tensas Parish Billie L. Ainsworth of Tulsa, Oklahoma Carolyn L. Carrow of Monroe
- Occupation: Farmer, cattleman; businessman
- 1. In 1970, the Shreveport Times identified then retired legislator Lacy as one of the most influential persons in Bienville Parish.; 2. Lacy and his wife, the former Sallie Williams, both served on the Bienville Parish School Board for a combined forty-one years.

John Len Lacy, known as Len Lacy (September 8, 1900 – June 7, 1998), was a Louisiana politician and businessman who served as a Democratic member of the Louisiana House of Representatives from Castor, Louisiana, from 1964 to 1968.

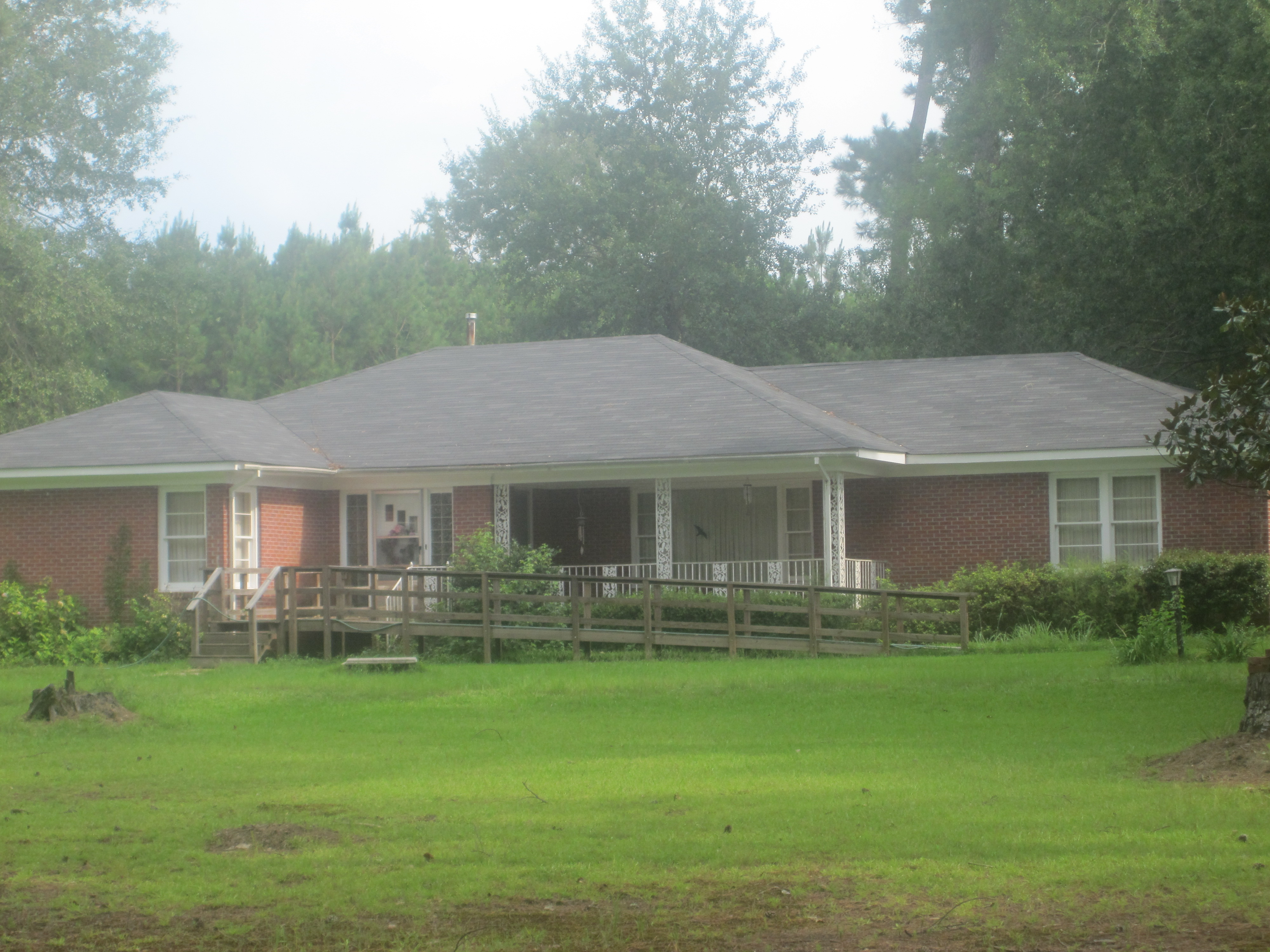
Len and Sallie Lacy House in Castor, Louisiana

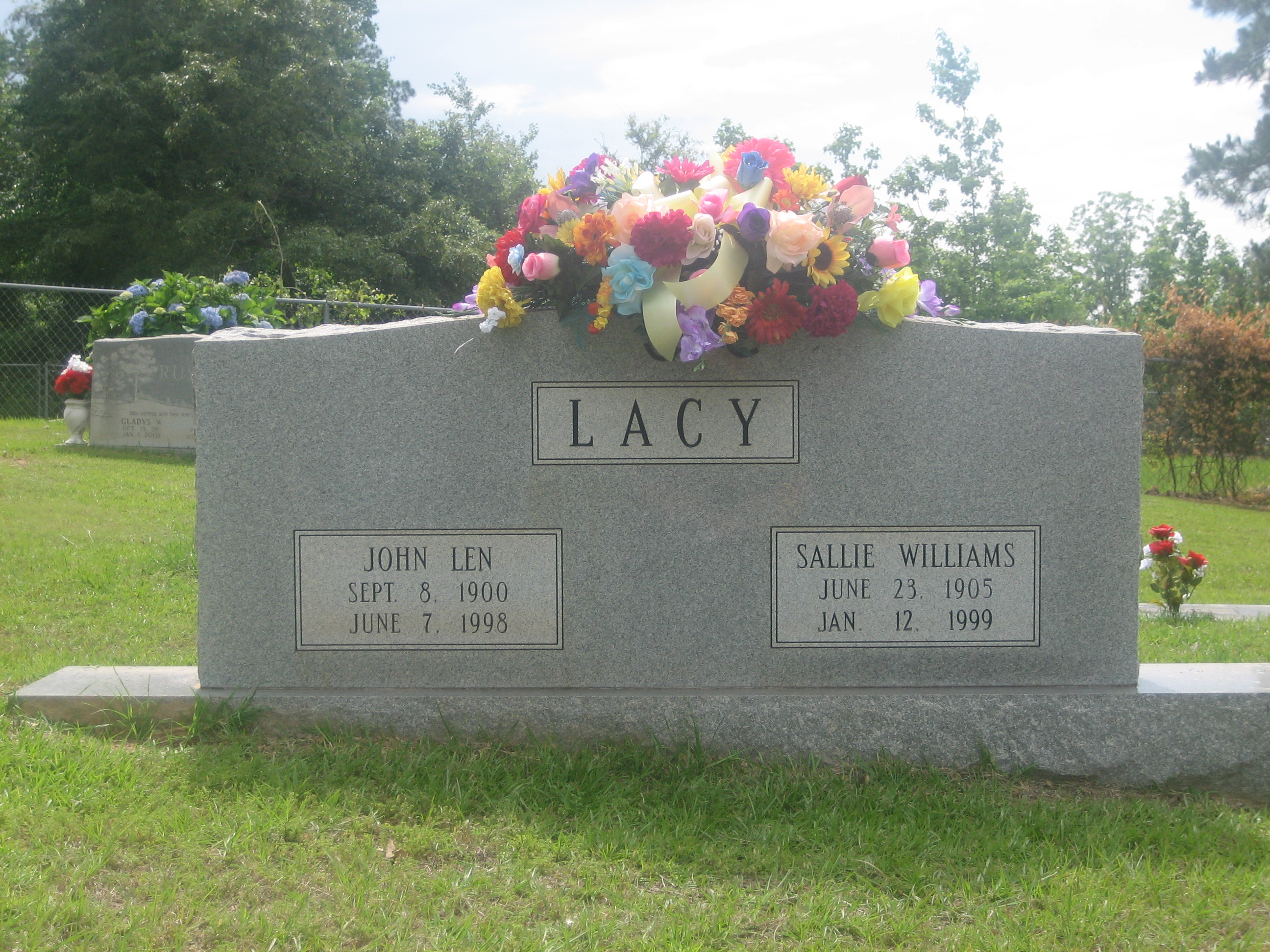
Graves of Len and Sallie Lacy at New Ebenezer Cemetery in Castor

Following Lacy's service, representation for his parish was combined with that of neighboring Jackson Parish, Louisiana, and Lacy was defeated in the 1967 Democratic primary by Jackson Parish native Edgerton L. "Bubba" Henry. In 1970, The Shreveport Times named Lacy one of the most influential persons in Bienville Parish, for advice he gave on business and politics.<obit/>

Lacy married Sallie Williams, with whom he had three daughters.

Preceded by C. L. McCrary	Louisiana State Representative from Bienville Parish; 1964–1968	Succeeded by Edgerton L. "Bubba" Henry
