= Lacy Irvine Moffett =

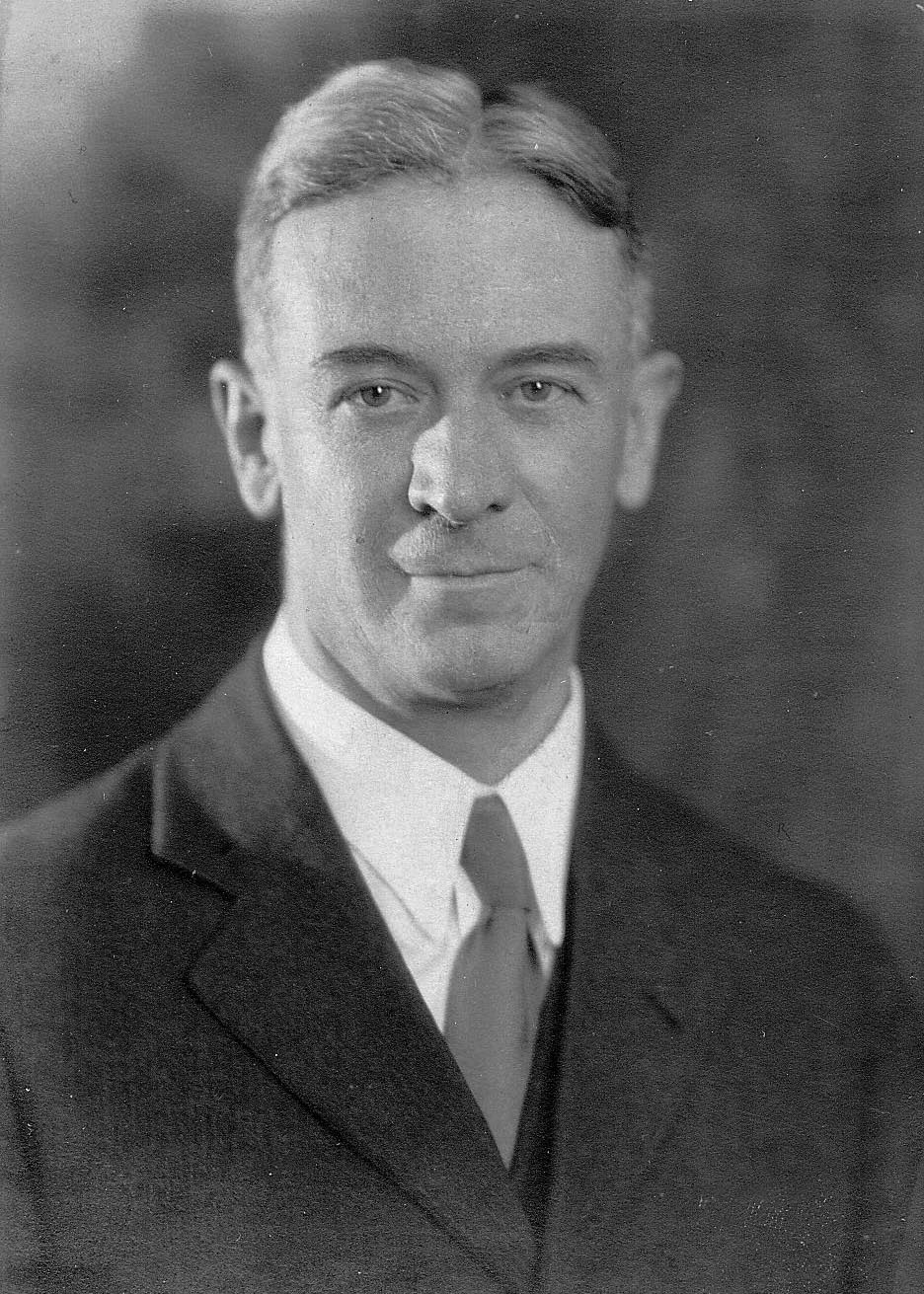
Lacy Moffett at about 50

Lacy Irvine Moffett (February 10, 1878 – October 2, 1957) was a Presbyterian missionary minister to China beginning in 1904 and he and his family served until 1940. He was a missionary minister, a self-taught expert on the birds of China, and a photographer.

== History ==
Lacy Irvine Moffett was born February 10, 1878, in Churchville, Virginia and destined from birth to become a missionary minister. His father, Rev. Alexander Stuart Moffett, was a Presbyterian minister. All of his Moffett ancestors were Scotch-Irish arriving before the American Revolution, seeking the opportunity to worship freely and govern themselves. All were Presbyterians—many were of the strict Covenanter persuasion. Their commitment to the church led them to take on leadership roles, often serving as ministers and elders. The ancestors of Moffett's mother, Carrie Lena Crawford, also included several prominent Presbyterian ministers.

Few details are recorded of Moffett's boyhood. His family moved several times, from Virginia to Kentucky and Missouri as his father accepted new ministerial assignments. His parents had sought to become missionaries to Brazil, but were prevented from doing so for reasons of health. After this rejection, Lacy's mother, Carrie Lena, wrote in her diary, “I feel that my life work: the work God has given me to do now; is to train my darling children for God and His service; as missionaries; ALL of them if it be his will.”

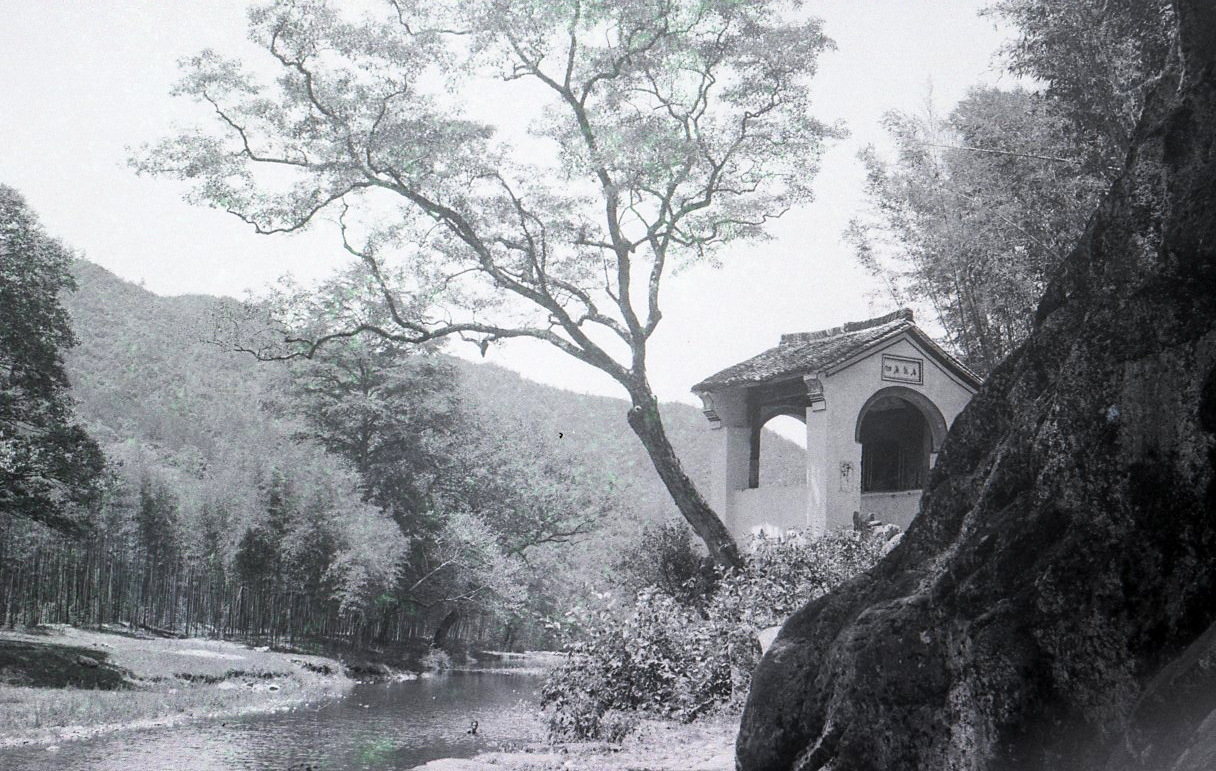
Lacy's photography

Six of the couple's eight children eventually served in China. Another son, Harry, became a minister and served as chaplain at Davidson University.

Moffett had a keen eye for photography. He took and developed a large number of traditional photographs that chronicled his family's missionary years in China. In addition to these, he also photographed many of the beautiful landscapes he observed.

== Early Ministry ==
Moffett graduated from Centre College in Kentucky in 1898 and completed his theological training at Union Theological Seminary in Virginia in 1902. He felt the call to missionary work, but saw a greater need to develop support for missions in his home church. To accomplish this, he volunteered to work for the Forward Movement for two years. Forward Movement was primarily a fund-raising effort that had been successfully used by the Northern Presbyterians and other Protestant denominations.

Moffett was joined in his Forward Movement work by John Leighton Stuart, his college roommate, who had also recently graduated from Union Theological Seminary. John Leighton Stuart would later become the first president of Yenching University in Beijing and serve as the United States Ambassador to China. Moffett and Stuart, along with J. Fairman Preston from Princeton, brought the Forward Movement into the Southern Presbyterian Church. The efforts of the three young men met with great success—contributions to missions increased four-fold.

During their Forward Movement travels, Moffett and Stuart met two sisters, Kate and Aileen Rodd, residents of New Orleans. This meeting quickly led to twin romances, one between Moffett and Kate Rodd and the other between Stuart and Aileen Rodd. After a brief courtship, the two couples were married on November 17, 1904. A few days after their wedding in New Orleans, Kate and Lacy Moffett boarded a ship and proceeded to their first missionary assignment in Suzhou, China. In Suzhou, they began the task of learning the language and how to work in China.

=== In Jiangyin ===
In September 1908, Kate Rodd and Moffett transferred to the mission in Jiangyin (Kiangyin), China. In Jiangyin, Moffett inherited a largely dysfunctional religious community. Many converts and ministers were “rice Christians,” people who converted to Christianity in order to receive charity or other material advantages. In later years, Moffett recalled, “For the first ten years, we turned more people out of the Church than we took in.”

Moffett was responsible for a circuit of small towns and villages in the district north of Jiangyin. His work included “preaching and teaching the Chinese Christians and Inquirers and visiting in the homes of the people as well as making friends with the merchants, farmers and all wherever he went.” Travel to the country missions required ingenuity and stamina. Moffett normally traveled to the chapels in his district by houseboat. He would typically be gone a week or more. For many years, he spent more Sundays in the field than at home. During these periods, Kate accepted the responsibility for managing the large household and for educating the children.

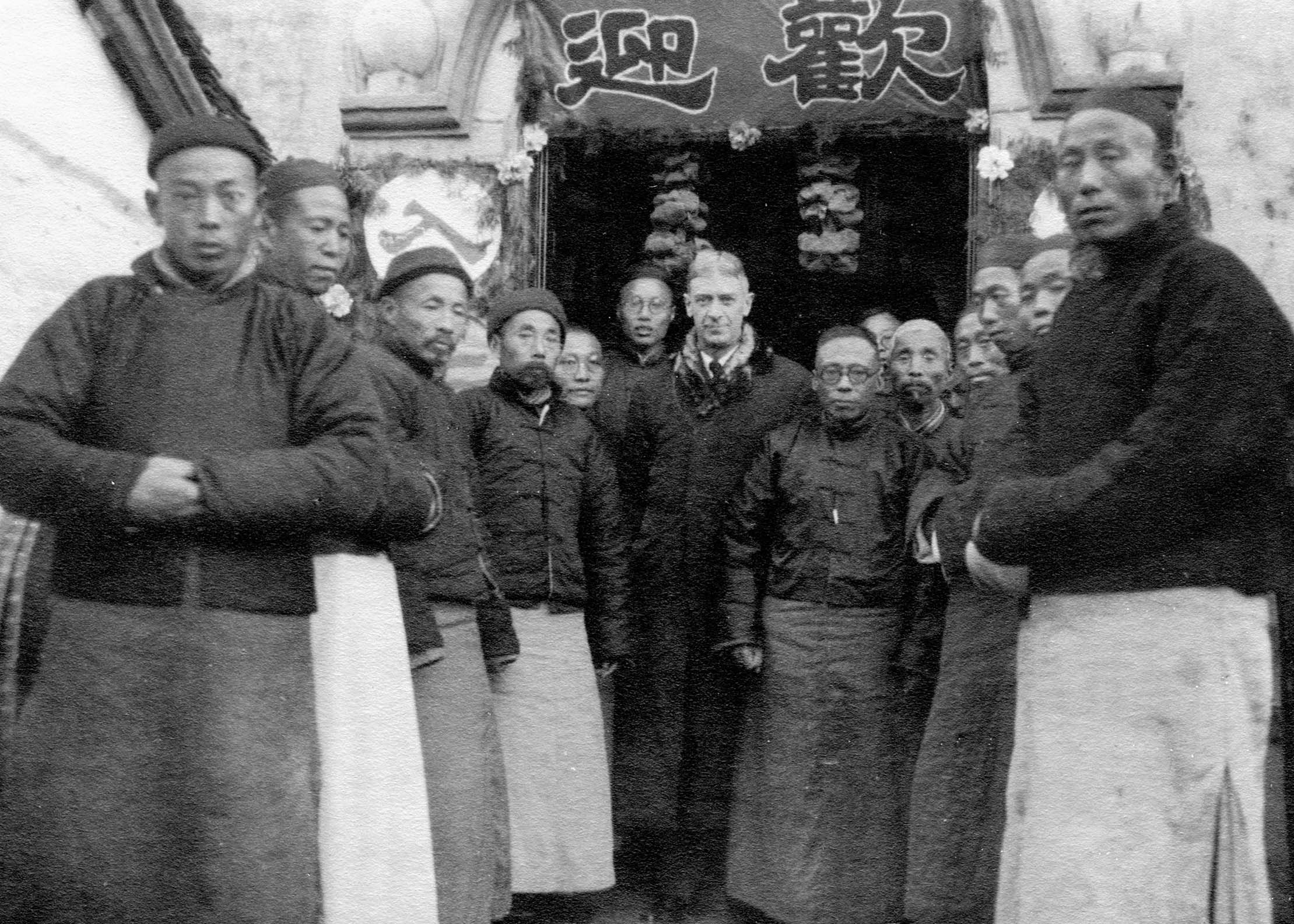
Lacy Moffett with Chinese Ministers

A primary goal of Moffett's missionary work was to train the native Chinese evangelical workers, most of whom had had very little formal instruction, to become effective ministers. One of the most fruitful schemes that Moffett established was to gather all the evangelistic workers together, both Chinese and missionary, once a month. For three days, they lived and worked together. Rev. Charles Worth later recalled these times. “Taking the ministers out of their home churches was important. They were cut off in their own churches with too little contact with other Christian leaders. They needed help and encouragement and a chance to study the Bible together, to have fellowship with one another, and to go out in teams to preach in the village.”

Moffett also participated in regional meetings of western missionaries. His style was low key and thoughtful. One short biography concluded: “Dr. Moffett is characterized by wise judgment as well as by evangelic zeal. He does not speak often in mission deliberations, but when he does, he usually strikes twelve.”

With the fall of the Qing dynasty in 1912, several competitive forces battled to gain control of China. During the ensuing years, the Jiangyin Mission was regularly confronted with periods of turmoil prompted by the beginnings of the Republic of China, the dangerous warlord years, the resentment over Western imperialism, the growth of Communism, the rising threat of Japan, and finally, the Second Sino-Japanese War itself. A fellow missionary later reflected on Moffett, “The strains and the stresses of the years cannot be fully understood or appreciated by any except those who experienced them. In all that time, I never once saw him lose his poise or seem to be confused.”

In January, 1932, the Japanese launched an assault on China which would eventually develop into the Sino-Japanese War. Foreign missionary stations like those in Jiangyin enjoyed extraterritorial rights and in theory, were considered safe from invasion or bombardment. In reality, as early as February, 1932, the Japanese invasion of China approached Jiangyin, but did not enter at that time.

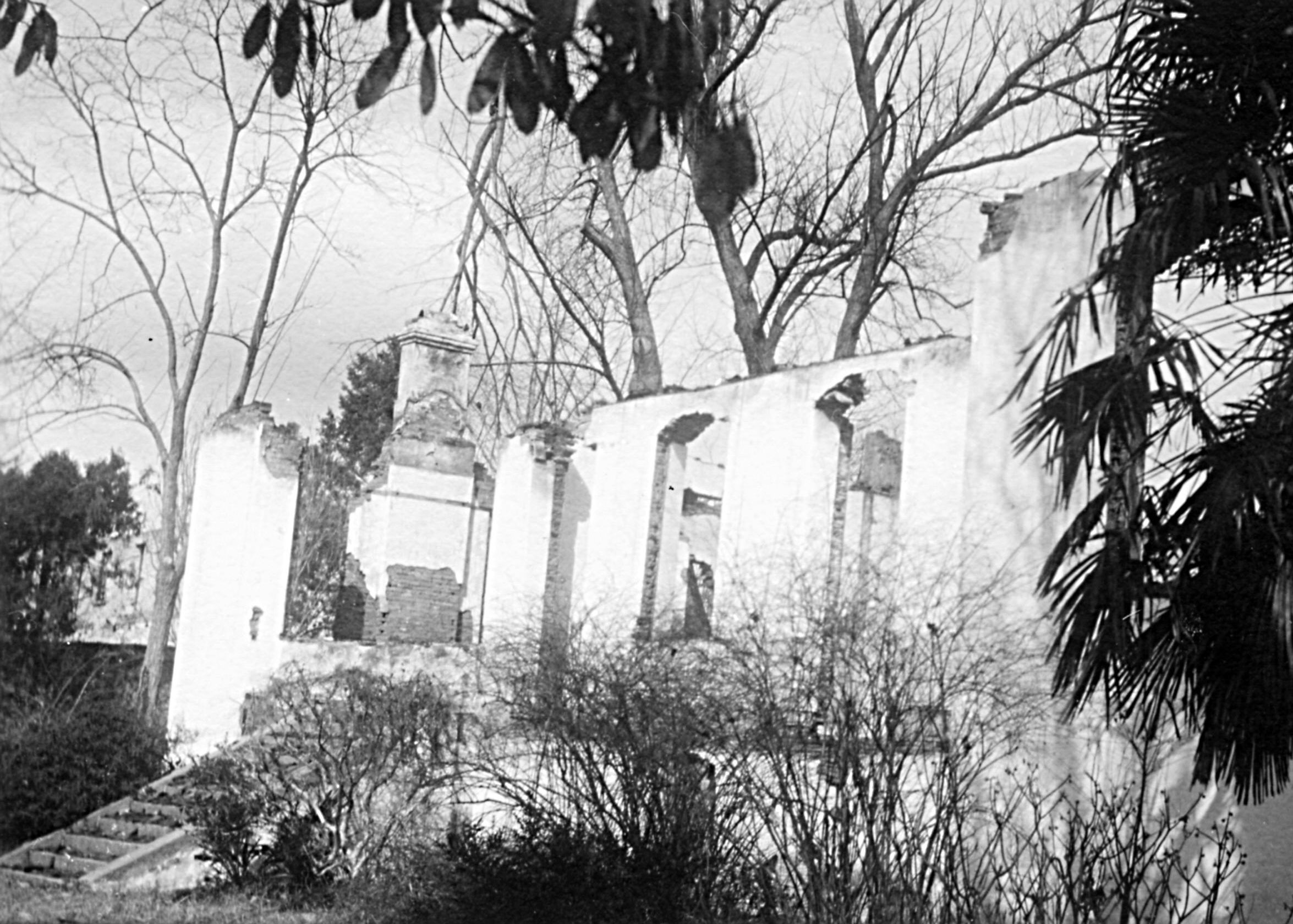
Moffett Home after Japanese Bombing

The work of the Jiangyin Mission continued and the years of work were bearing fruit. Kate Moffett wrote to her children in April, 1935: “How we do thank God for the way the work of God’s kingdom is going right ahead under the leadership in large measure of the consecrated Chinese workers. The day is certainly coming when there won’t be much real need of missionaries in many of our stations.

The Japanese finally attacked Jiangyin on December 1, 1937 and the city fell to the superior forces. A week later, a group of Japanese entered the mission compound, stripped the buildings of their contents and set them afire. Seventeen of the twenty buildings in the compound were completely destroyed, including the Moffett home. Lacy and Kate Moffett were on furlough in the United States at the time of the attack.

In November 1938, when many missionaries and other foreigners were leaving China, Kate and Lacy Moffett returned to China. The China they returned to was a very different country from the one they had left. Initially, the family found a small apartment in Shanghai, but in March 1939, Lacy and his son Alex returned to the Jiangyin Mission and lived in two rooms of a bombed out house. Kate was able to join them in October, 1939. Ultimately, the dangers and stress of remaining in the region increased and the family was forced to leave the mission and China. On November 3, 1940, Lacy, Kate and two of their children boarded a ship for the United States marking the end of thirty-six years of service in China.

== Retirement ==
Moffett was 62 years old when he and his family returned to the United States. At that point, many might have sought a graceful retirement, but Lacy clearly looked upon his return as an opportunity to continue his service to the Lord. He fit “himself into the home church as though he had been here in America all along. He served several city churches most acceptably as supply preacher and he was the beloved pastor of the Banner Elk Church with its mountain chapel.””

On June 1, 1948, Moffett was honorably retired as a missionary of the Presbyterian Church. In the tribute, it was recognized that “there are few missionaries who we hold in so high a place of honor and esteem in the heart of the Church.” Lacy was now 70 years old, but he continued to preach as a visiting minister until 1954. He also spoke out against racial injustice. In the early 1950s, he wrote, “Racial prejudice is not a natural human attitude. It is cultivated or learned from association. Children do not have it until taught by their elders.”

Moffett died on October 2, 1957, and was buried in Taylorsville, North Carolina.

== Lacy Moffett and the Birds of China ==
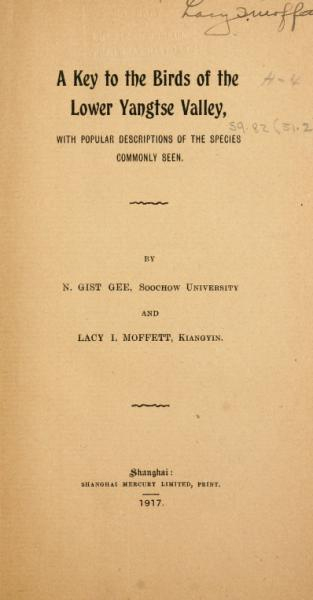
Bird Book 1917

Moffett's curiosity and love of the natural world led him to become fascinated by the birds of his adopted county. As a hobby, he began to collect bird specimen and to document the local birds. His canal travels to outlying mission stations, walks in the nearby countryside, and hunting trips would all have provided opportunities to observe birds in the native habitat. Eventually, Lacy began to document and compile his sightings which led to an article published in 1912, “Common Birds of the Yangtze Delta.” At the very end of his article, he wrote “Chinese bird-lovers are still waiting for some competent ornithologist to give us a popular key to the birds of China.”

The challenge to prepare a comprehensive key to the birds of China was quickly accepted by N. Gist Gee. Because of his scientific background and position as a university professor, Gee was likely the initiator and organizer of the effort, but he recognized Lacy's extensive knowledge and asked him to be coauthor. Beginning in 1913, Gee and Lacy coauthored three publications that provided increasingly more complete and scientific descriptions of the birds of China. The first article was a limited “Check List of Birds of the Lower Yangtze Valley from Hankow to the Sea” published in 1913. This list was followed in 1917 by a 221-page book,A Key to the Birds of the Lower Yangtze Valley seen. In 1926, G. D. Wilder joined Lacy and Gee and together the three authored A Tentative List of Chinese Birds.

In addition to his writing, Lacy captured and processed many bird specimen. He sent hundreds of bird skins, properly prepared and identified, to the Smithsonian Institution in Washington.
