= Lacy J. Davis =

American writer and body image activist

Lacy J. Davis is a writer and a body image activist. Her memoir, Ink in Water: An Illustrated Memoir (Or, How I Kicked Anorexia's Ass and Embraced Body Positivity) details Davis' struggles with body dysmorphia and dieting. She co-owns the body positive gym Liberation Barbell, runs the blog Super Strength Health and hosts the Flex Your Heart Radio podcast.
