= Star Billions =

2015 video game

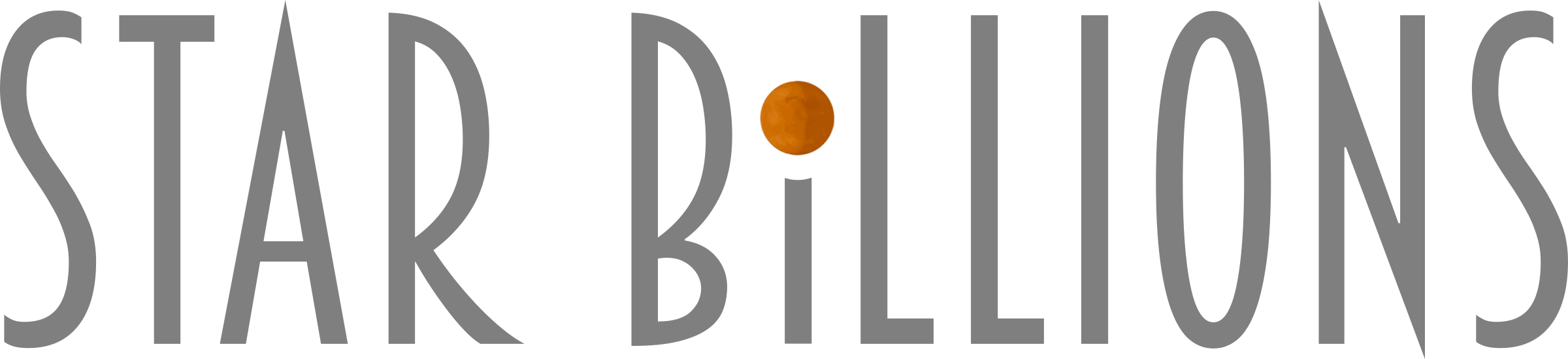
- Developers: Catch & Release, LLC
- Designers: Matthew Taylor, James Tillman
- Artists: Juan J. Lopez, Christian Vázquez, Kevin Campbell
- Writers: Matthew Taylor, James Tillman
- Platforms: iOS, Android
- Release: iOS; December 8, 2015; Android; April 7, 2016
- Genre: Adventure
- Mode: Single-player

Star Billions is an indie adventure video game by Catch & Release, LLC, an independent development team consisting of game designers James Tillman and Matthew Taylor. The game's first season was released on December 8, 2015, for iOS devices and later ported to Android. In Star Billions, players observe a hopelessly lost spaceship that is piloted by four unique artificial intelligences represented by anthropomorphic animal characters. After each character presents its plan for resolving a given situation, the player must select the ideal AI to solve the problem. Star Billions takes place in real-time as players wait to see how their decision will affect the story. Players may also reduce the wait time by playing Game Boy style minigames.

== Plot ==
Star Billions takes place in the distant future. Humanity is forced to flee Earth aboard the "Big Brother" spacecraft after a series of disasters. The humans attempt to find a new planet suitable for organic life, but soon realize that their food and fuel stores will be depleted before an ideal planet is found. An advanced artificial intelligence known as EIN is placed in charge of finding a new planet while all of humanity is put into a state of cryogenic sleep. EIN constructs a small scouting vessel known as the "Little Brother" and programs three additional AIs with unique, human-like personalities designed to balance one another. These AIs are SARGE, ROSIE and LACIE.

== Development ==
The game's initial design was created by James Tillman just before he graduated from college in 2015. Co-designer Matthew Taylor visited James and found a crudely drawn design document for Star Billions. In this early phase, the artificial intelligences were not yet anthropomorphic animals and some characters featured different names that would later change.

== Reception ==
The game received generally positive reviews with VentureBeat praising the game's "presentation" and "charm" while Pocket Tactics described the game as "cute, funny [and] well-written." AppUnwrapper criticized the game's real-time elements, saying "In theory, it works. It makes it feel like the story is happening in real time, as you have to wait for the crew to travel to each destination. But it also interrupted the story every time I was getting into it."
