= Interlace =

Interlace or interlacing may refer to:

- Interlace (art), a decorative element found especially in early Medieval art in Northern Europe
- Interlacing (bitmaps), a method of incrementally displaying raster graphics
- Interlaced video is a technique of doubling the perceived frame rate without consuming extra bandwidth
- Interlaced track on railways and tramways is where two rail lines overlap spatially but are not connected
- The Interlace, an apartment building in Singapore
- Interlace or entrelacement, a medieval literary mode switching between parallel narrative threads found in such texts as Nibelungenlied, Poetic Edda, and Perceval, the Story of the Grail
