= Laci =

Laci or LACI may refer to:

== People ==
=== Given name ===
- Laci Boldemann (1921–1969), Swedish composer of German and Finnish descent
- Laci Endresz, (born 1974), English circus performer who performs as Mooky the Clown
- Laci Green (born 1989), American YouTube personality
- Laci Mosley, American actress, comedian, and podcaster
- Laci Peterson, a 2002 murder victim
- Laci Scott (born 1987), American beauty queen, 2005 Miss Oklahoma USA

=== Nickname ===
- László Babai (born 1950), Hungarian professor of computer science and mathematics
- László Várkonyi (1909–1972), Hungarian table tennis player

=== Surname ===
- Mergim Laci (born 2 April 1998) is a Swedish footballer
- Qazim Laçi (born 1996), Albanian footballer
- Vasil Laçi (1922–1941), Albanian would-be assassin of King Victor Emmanuel III of Italy and Albanian Prime Minister Shefqet Bej Vërlaci after the Italian occupation of Albania
- Žiga Laci (born 2002), Slovenian footballer
- de Laci, the surname of an old Norman noble family

== Acronym ==
- Lac repressor (LacI), a DNA-binding protein
- Lac I, a lactose operon
- Lacunar stroke or lacunar cerebral infarct (LACI), a type of stroke
- LA Cleantech Incubator (LACI), Los Angeles's official cleantech business incubator

== Other uses ==
- Laçi, a city in northwestern Albania
  - KF Laçi, a football club based in the city

== See also ==
- Lace (disambiguation)
- Lacey (disambiguation)
- Lacie (disambiguation)
- Lacy (disambiguation)
