= Azuma Sakamoto =

Japanese voice actress

- 坂本 梓馬
- Born: October 9, 1984 (age 41); Fukushima Prefecture, Japan
- Occupation: Voice actress
- Years active: 2006–present
- Agent: Office Watanabe

Azuma Sakamoto (坂本 梓馬, Sakamoto Azuma; born October 9, 1984 in Fukushima Prefecture) is a Japanese voice actress affiliated with Office Watanabe.

== Filmography ==
=== Television animation ===
- Asatte no Hōkō (Friend B)
- Avatar: The Last Airbender (Toph)
- Blood+ (Boy)
- Clannad After Story (Yū)
- Love Get Chu ~Miracle Voice Actress Hakusho~ (Tsubasa Ono)
- Otogi-Jūshi Akazukin (Hiroto Kisugi)
- Pandora Hearts (Young Gilbert)

=== OVA ===
- Mizu×Mizu Drops (Sae Uran)
- Shigofumi: Letters from the Departed (Takuma Renkon)

=== Radio ===
- Fuiatsū (FarEast Amusement Research/Enterbrain, guest personality)
- Yurishii: Azuma no Love Get Chu Miracle Radio (Osaka Broadcasting Corporation)

=== CD ===
- Pandora Hearts (Young Gilbert Nightray)
