= Lacey Green (disambiguation) =

Lacey Green is a village and civil parish in Buckinghamshire, England.

Lacey Green may also refer to:

- Lacey Green, Cheshire, England
- Lacey Green, London, England
- Lacey Greene, a character in the comic book series Walking Dead

== See also ==
- Laci Green (born 1989), American YouTuber
