= Lacy, South Dakota =

Coordinates: 44°29′44″N 100°42′05″W

Lacy is an extinct town in Stanley County, in the U.S. state of South Dakota. The GNIS classifies it as a populated place.

== History ==
A post office called Lacy was established in 1903, and remained in operation until 1942. The town has the name of a local pioneer settler.
