= Lacy Dock =

American baseball player

- Second baseman
- Born: January 22, 1896; Lexington, Virginia, U.S.
- Died: December 8, 1963 (aged 67); Dayton, Ohio, U.S.
- Threw: Right

Negro league baseball debut
- 1918, for the Dayton Marcos

Last appearance
- 1919, for the Dayton Marcos

Teams
- Dayton Marcos (1918–1919)

Lacy Lee Dock (January 22, 1896 – December 8, 1963) was an American Negro league second baseman in the 1910s.

A native of Lexington, Virginia, Dock played for the Dayton Marcos in 1918 and 1919. In 10 recorded career games, he posted four hits in 36 plate appearances. Dock died in Dayton, Ohio in 1963 at age 67.
