= List of Pandora Hearts episodes =

Pandora Hearts is an anime television series adaptation based on the manga series of the same name by written and illustrated by Jun Mochizuki. It is directed by Takao Kato under the studio XEBEC. The series debuted on April 2, 2009, through the Japanese TV networks TBS and BS-TBS. The series uses four theme songs: one opening song, two ending songs, and one insert song. The opening theme is "Parallel Hearts" by FictionJunction, and the ending themes are "Maze" by Savage Genius feat. Tomoe Ohmi and "Watashi wo Mitsukete" by Savage Genius. The insert song "Every Time You Kissed Me" performed by Emily Bindiger is used in the last episode.

== Episode listing ==
No.	Title	Original release date
1	"Innocent Calm"; Transliteration: "Tsumi Naki Heion" (Japanese: 罪なき平穏)	April 2, 2009
Oz Vessalius spends his 15th birthday running away from his maids with his younger sister, Ada, and servant, Gilbert. They hide at Oz's secret spot where he accidentally falls through the ground leading to a hidden grove containing a single grave with a pocket watch attached to it. When Oz grabs the pocket watch from the tomb, he sees a vision of himself being strangled by a girl before being brought back to reality by Gilbert. While he prepares for his coming-of-age ceremony, strange figures gather and prepare to carry out their scheme.
2	"Tempest of Conviction"; Transliteration: "Danzai no Arashi" (Japanese: 断罪の嵐)	April 9, 2009
After Oz leaves for the ceremony, Gilbert is possessed by a death god. At the ceremony, Oz takes his oath, causing the ceremonial clock which was silent for 100 years to suddenly ring and bring forth strange figures who aim to cast Oz into a place called the Abyss. The possessed Gilbert tries to kill Oz and succeeds in stabbing him. Meanwhile, the girl from Oz's vision appears in the form of the Blood-Stained Black Rabbit and fights them to save Oz from being pulled into the Abyss. Gilbert snaps out of the trance, sees an intruder's face, and uses himself as a shield to stop Oz from killing the intruder, subsequently receiving a slash across his chest. Oz is then thrown into the Abyss for the sin of existing.
3	"Prisoner & Alichino"; Transliteration: "Maigo to Kuro-Usagi" (Japanese: 迷い子と黒うさぎ)	April 16, 2009
Oz is pulled down into the Abyss. He explores a bit and discovers the place is like a broken toy box and that the place looks the same no matter where he goes. Some dolls attack him before the Black Rabbit or B-Rabbit arrives and saves him once again. First, he is fearful of the girl, who tells him to call her Alice, but he soon warms up and begins to eat cookies. When asked by Alice why he isn't afraid of her, he simply replies that too many unexpected incidents have happened to him already. He learned that he should remain calm whenever strange things happen in order to stop others from being hurt. She says that Oz is required to make a contract with her in order to leave the Abyss, and he seriously thinks about it, until he's transported away. After a fake Sharon, which is actually a Chain (a monster born in and from the Abyss) misleads him, he finally agrees to form a contract with Alice. They both leave the Abyss and Raven, a mysterious new figure, Sharon, and Break, her servant, find him lying on the ground just as they were about to save him. Break starts to ask questions to Oz and B-Rabbit.
4	"Rendezvous"; Transliteration: "Asahikage no Basho" (Japanese: 朝日影の場所)	April 23, 2009
Oz wakes up to see Raven, Sharon and Break. Upon seeing Raven, Oz calls him Gil. Raven's appearance is similar to Gilbert's - he has black hair and golden eyes. Break explains to Oz about Pandora (an organization whose objective is to find out anything they can about the Abyss), the residents of Baskerville (Pandora's enemies), and the organization's main goal. Alice then possesses Oz and takes Sharon hostage in order to escape, but Break stops her by forcing the B-Rabbit from Oz's body. After her release from Oz, Break exclaims that he will have to kill Alice. Oz forbids it, saying that Alice is not an enemy, for it was through her that he escaped the horrible Abyss and that it is Break who is an enemy - someone who Oz had only seen once and is now attacking his friend. Break backs down, and blames the attack on Emily, his puppet. Oz's pocket watch then starts to act strangely. Raven comments that the door to the Abyss had opened and a chain escaped. By using Raven's chain's powers, Raven is able to control the B-Rabbit's powers from within Oz, and with this power, Alice could release her full form and defeat the chain. After the door to the abyss was closed, Alice found out why it had reacted to her. The music lured her to the watch because it contained one of her memory shards. Oz then remembered that a man from another one of his visions had told him about Alice.
5	"Clockwise Doom"; Transliteration: "Tokeimawari no Akumu" (Japanese: 時計回りの悪夢)	April 30, 2009
Break gives Oz, Alice, and Raven their first mission. They are sent to a nearby town in search of an illegal contractor, someone who makes a contract with a chain without the permission of Pandora. While there, Alice goes missing and Raven goes to look for her. Alone, Oz sees a young girl selling flowers. When the trio have dinner, Oz realizes Raven's other personality, which reminds him of Gil (especially the black hair and golden eyes). Raven then informs Oz of why people become illegal contractors - to change the past. As Alice falls asleep, Raven and Oz leave to finish their mission. Meanwhile, Sharon and Break are discussing the mission and how they had kept some information secret. Alice is soon awakened by an attack by a chain, whose contractor turns out to be the girl that was selling flowers. As Raven shoots the chain, the girl's clock seal makes a full rotation. She gets drawn into the Abyss, screaming. Oz tries to save her, but is restrained by Raven, to stop him from being dragged down into the Abyss again. On the ride home, Raven informs them that the only way to stop Oz from being dragged into the Abyss when his clock makes a full rotation is to kill Alice, which initiates an argument between Alice and Raven. The episode ends with a death god laughing inside the Vessalius mansion.
6	"Where am I?"; Transliteration: "Kuichigatta Genzaichi" (Japanese: 食い違った現在地)	May 7, 2009
Oz decides to return to the mansion, where his coming of age ceremony took place. However, upon arrival, the state of the mansion appears deserted and worn down, unlike the rich glorious mansion as Oz remembers. At the same time, memories pertaining to Gil are recollected, including Oz's insistence of his role as master protecting his servant. As Raven scouts the mansion on his own, he's ambushed by Doldam's marionettes. During the fight, it is revealed that Raven is an older Gil and that ten years have passed since the coming of age ceremony. As Doldam once again controls Gil, Oz faces a controlled Gil just like before.
7	"Whisperer"; Transliteration: "Shin'en Kara no Yobigoe" (Japanese: 深淵からの呼び声)	May 14, 2009
Oz manages to shock Raven back to himself, and his gun fires, but at Zwei instead of Oz. Oz follows Raven, who claims that he is no longer the Gilbert Oz once knew, to the place where they found the pocket watch. Oz convinces Gil that he won't let him go even if he has joined the Nightray house (an enemy of Bezarius). Oz goes back for Alice, and on the way to the grave they catch a glimpse of one of Alice's memories, and are drawn into a dream dimension where they are confronted by the Will of the Abyss, who appears in the form of a stuffed rabbit. Gilbert shoots the rabbit and they escape.
8	"Question"; Transliteration: "Inja no Toikake" (Japanese: 隠者の問い掛け)	May 21, 2009
Oz wakes up in Gilbert's house, and ponders on the questions the Will of the Abyss had asked him earlier. Break then enters the house, and talks to Oz and Alice regarding the topic of chains, and why he and Sharon had not aged. Thus, Oz realizes that as an illegal contractor, his clock had already begun moving. Break then comments that although he can see Oz, he cannot 'see' his presence. This had annoyed Oz. A girl comes into the house and drops a letter in the name of Vincent. Later, Gilbert takes Oz and Alice outside, where her craving for meat is unleashed. Oz stays back to wait for them to buy food. Meanwhile Alice wonders what 'parents' mean and decides to ask Oz, only to be stopped by Gil. He tells her the reason that Oz is sensitive to the topic, and why he acts in such a self-harming way. At the same time, Oz sees a group of boys bullying a child, and saves him. They begin to talk.
9	"Malediction"; Transliteration: "Noroi no Kotoba" (Japanese: 呪いの言葉)	May 28, 2009
Oz saves a boy named Phillip, a kid from a noble family that just became poor. A flashback came to Oz when Philip asked about Oz's parents. 10 years ago, young Gilbert was about to ask why Oz's father wouldn't talk to him. He responded that Oz is too filthy and unfit to be his son. After three days in the dungeon, Gil apologizes to Oz for interfering in his life, but Oz says that it doesn't matter and accepts the fact that his father just hates him. After the flashback, the girl who brought the flowers, named Echo, comes to take Philip as a hostage, whose father is revealed to have become an illegal contractor. Pandora member, Reim (Liam), explains that Grim escaped their grasp unharmed, which is distressing. While Echo chases after Phillip and Oz chases her, Gil and Alice look for a chain that Alice has sensed. Since it is no use for Phillip to be a hostage, Echo goes after the chain. She is injured in the process, but Vincent comes along and holds her back. He tells her to just watch. Gil then releases Alice's powers, but Oz wants to stop her from killing Phillip's father. In his mind, the man from his vision tells him that he can hold her back.
10	"Grim"; Transliteration: "Kasanaru Kage" (Japanese: 重なる影)	June 4, 2009
Oz somehow manages to suppress Alice's power, and confronts Phillip's father. Amid memories of his own father's coldness, Oz tells him that being by Phillip's side will be enough even without changing their past tragedies. Their conversation is cut short as Vincent Nightray shoots Grim's contractor and sends him back to the abyss. They return in Vincent's carriage and ride to the Reinsworth manor, where Alice asks Oz why he was so worked up over Phillip's father, and Vincent claims to be a blood relative of Gilbert. Break shows Vincent to the door while discussing a theory that somebody inside Pandora was responsible for allowing Grim to escape. It is clear that Break suspects Vincent.
11	"A Lost Raven"; Transliteration: "Otosareta Karasu" (Japanese: 堕とされた鴉)	June 11, 2009
Gilbert talks about what happened in the ten years that passed when Oz disappeared. Break tells him to go spy at the Nightray family, where he also could get information on the chain, Raven, and get Oz back from Abyss. Initially, Gil is hesitant about going with the Nightrays as Vessalius and Nightray households are rivals. In the end, he chooses to go with Break, and met Vincent. Upon their reunion, Gil reveals that he had no memory of Vincent, his younger brother. As he grew, he finally found a way to tame Raven, and ultimately establish a contract with it. This is how Gil gained his nickname "Raven".
12	"Welcome to Labyrinth"; Transliteration: "Kagami no Kuni" (Japanese: 鏡の国)	June 18, 2009
Gil is furious that Oz has lost his hat, and they set out to find it. They are challenged to a duel in order to win the hat back, and Gil finally gets it by using the B-rabbit's power. After a brief reunion with Uncle Oscar, Alice runs away, only to meet Break, where they are both caught and sent to the Cheshire Cat's (a chain similar to Alice) residence. There, Alice is trapped within her memories of fear, while Break is drawn into a mirror of his own past. Meanwhile, Oz discovers her missing and goes to consult Sharon. He ponders that Break left Emily in order to lure him to the Cheshire Cat's home. Sharon uses her chain Eques to open the path for Oz and Gil.
13	"Keeper of the Secret"; Transliteration: "Yuganda Kioku no Jūnin" (Japanese: 歪んだ記憶の住人)	June 25, 2009
Oz and Gilbert arrive in Cheshire's dimension and are attacked by Cheshire, only to be temporarily rescued by Sharon's chain, Eques. As they try to escape from Cheshire, he catches up with them, slashes Gil(who falls off the stair railings) and attacks Oz. Cheshire tells Oz that Alice purposely tore up her memories of her own free will and that this dimension is made by Alice's memories. Cheshire also reveals his duty of protecting Alice's memories so that no one can find them. Gil later regains consciousness in a garden and encounters the man in Alice's memories, whom Gil mistakes for Oz as they both have blond hair and emerald green eyes. The man reveals his name to be Jack Vessalius.
14	"Hollow Eye Socket"; Transliteration: "Akaki Sekigan no Akuma" (Japanese: 紅き隻眼の悪魔)	July 2, 2009
The Cheshire Cat is toying with Oz, who responds by making wisecracks. Oz is pulled through the mirror by Jack, and reunited with Gil. Jack asks Oz to help save Alice, who has been trapped inside a memory. Jack sends Oz by himself (upsetting Gil) into the memory of the Tragedy of Sabrie, where he sees a boy which he believes to be Vincent. Bewildered, he chases the boy and follows him to a tower where he finds Alice, dead. Meanwhile, the Cheshire Cat approaches Break within the mirror to finish him off, only to have the tables turned when Break opens his missing eye to unleash his chain, the Mad Hatter.
15	"Who Killed Poor Alice?"; Transliteration: "Ta ga Tame no Kotoba" (Japanese: 誰がための言葉)	July 9, 2009
After seeing a murdered Alice, Oz is devastated. Because of his shock, Oz's clock hand moves again, and he begins to destroy Cheshire's dimension using B. Rabbit's power. He justifies his actions by saying that it was for Alice and he'd take that fear away from her, even to the point where he says that he would kill Alice, but only says these things because he's in a trance. During that time, Jack sent Gil to help Oz. Meanwhile, Break is overpowering Cheshire using Mad Hatter. Break takes the truth of the Tragedy of Sabrie and Alice's memories in the form of Cheshire's bell. After Oz realizes he came to Cheshire's dimension to save Alice, he and Gil find her in chains on a staircase contemplating about herself. As Oz climbs the stairs, he tells Alice that it doesn't matter if she's human or a chain, being "Alice" is fine and saves her. Cheshire becomes angry and abandons his human form for a monstrous black form and leads Break to Oz, Alice, and Gil. Cheshire is destroying his dimension for the same reasons that Oz mentioned earlier. Break easily defeats Cheshire, and Alice realizes that Cheshire was once her precious pet cat. Eques appears to return the group to their world. However, Break and Gil get separated from Oz and Alice and are left in Cheshire's dimension. Eques brings Oz and Alice back to their world, but they interrupt a Pandora meeting with Uncle Oscar involved and Alice is in her B. Rabbit form.
16	"His Name is..." Transliteration: "Eiyū to Shōnen" (Japanese: 英雄と少年)	July 16, 2009
Oz and Alice, in her B.Rabbit form, are in the middle of a Pandora meeting. Everyone there thinks that they mean to harm the four dukes and chase them. While they are being chased, we discover that Break and Gil got back safely by using Gil's chain, Raven. But, because he used it, the seal on Alice was broken and that is why she is in her B.Rabbit form. Later, when Oz and Alice are cornered, Jack Vessalius takes over Oz's body, and speaks to Pandora, saying that Glen Baskerville is not dead, and that Oz is the key to saving them from the repeat of the Tragedy of Sabrie. It ends with Oz telling Break what he had seen in Cheshire's realm, including Vincent, making Break suspicious.
17	"Hello My Sister!"; Transliteration: "Kaikyū no Senritsu" (Japanese: 懐旧の旋律)	July 23, 2009
Break goes to save the kidnapped Sharon from Vincent, but in doing so, he has to destroy Cheshire's bell (the truth of the Tragedy of Sabrie). Vincent poisoned her as well so Break would have to do what he wanted quickly. He holds the antidote over the edge of his balcony, calling Break a fool, but as it falls, Echo saves it. Meanwhile, Oz learns about Break's past, and how the Rainsworths found him at the Abyss' door and his acceptance. Later, Oscar receives a letter from Ada from Latowidge, her private academy, indicating that she has a crush on someone. In order to find out who that is, Oscar makes them sneak into the school. They find her, but their meeting (Oz and Ada) was awkward as both didn't know whether the other would remember them or accept how they are now. Though they were able to happily reunite eventually. Oscar then questions her about the letter, which leads Ada to reveal that she gave Gil his hat. Oz chases after Gil, thinking he is her love interest, but soon, he and Ada get lost. Oz runs down a hallway after he hears the melody from his pocket watch being played.
18	"Eliot & Leo"; Transliteration: "Toaru Jūsha no Shi ni Tsuite" (Japanese: とある従者の死について)	July 30, 2009
At Latowidge Academy, Oz encounters two students named Leo and Eliot in the library, and soon gets into an argument with Elliot. Whilst trying to avoid him, Oz and Ada are captured by some Baskervilles and taken to a secret chamber beneath the school. However, luckily for the siblings, Leo and Eliot arrive to help them escape. While in the tunnel, Eliot confronts Oz, asking him why he would give himself up so easily to save someone else, saying his sadness would just be placed on the ones he leaves behind.
19	"The Pool of Tears"; Transliteration: "Namida no Ike" (Japanese: 涙の池)	August 6, 2009
Oz, Eliot and Leo are trying to get Ada back to the school. Eliot continues to confront Oz about his willingness to sacrifice himself for others, asking him if he'd ever really saved anyone that way. Lotti releases her Chain, Leon, which looks like a large lion with a crown on its head. When the Baskervilles catch Oz and the others a battle erupts. B. Rabbit appears and so does Jack Vessalius. Then it turns to Lotti's memory of Jack Vessalius, over 100 years ago.
20	"Modulation"; Transliteration: "Utsuriyuku Oto" (Japanese: うつりゆく音)	August 13, 2009
After Oz, Eliot, Leo and Ada make it out of the secret tunnel at Latowidge Academy Oz remembers to ask about the melody he heard Eliot playing earlier, entitled "Lacie". Eliot claims to have written it, then asks Oz his name. Gilbert appears and Oz starts to kick him. Eliot then attacks Gilbert, much to Oz and Gil's surprise, telling him he should be ashamed of wearing a high school uniform at the age of 24. Gil reveals Oz's name when Eliot threatens Oz, and Eliot doesn't believe him. Back with Sharon and Break, Oz and Gil seem to be angry and depressed, while Alice is eating by herself. Sharon beats Break and Emily with a paper fan repeatedly and helps Alice with her emotions. Oscar enters with wine and everyone except Oz and Break get drunk. Then Gilbert starts yelling at the vase and the serving maid.
21	"Snow White Chaos"; Transliteration: "Junpaku no Kuro" (Japanese: 純白のくろ)	August 27, 2009
Oz and co. go to meet Rufus Barma in order to find out more about the Tragedy of Sabrie. He appears as a tubby old man. He refuses to tell them anything unless they exchange some information that he doesn't know and taunts Oz and Alice. Break then dispels Barma's illusions and confronts the real Rufus Barma, revealing his real intention of finding out more about Break's past. Barma calls him out as a man named Kevin Regnard, and slashes Break's clothing to reveal a completed contractor's seal on his chest. Break then collapses. His past is shown: Fifty years prior, he had made an illegal contract and murdered 116 people, becoming feared as "The Red-Eyed Phantom". He was dragged into Abyss when the hand on his seal made a full revolution. There, he was brought to the "Will of the Abyss" by his then-Chain, Albus, and had his left eye taken out by her, which she then gave to Cheshire. A young Vincent is seen entering through the gateway to the abyss when the tragedy of Sabrie occurs.
22	"Countervalue of Loss"; Transliteration: "Shitsui no Taika" (Japanese: 失意の対価)	September 3, 2009
Why would Vincent kill Alice's cat Cheshire and then kill her? As Break wakes from his fainting spell, he tells Duke Barma, Oz and the others about his time in Abyss. In the Will of the Abyss's room, Vincent shows up along with Gilbert in his arms. After Vincent collapses, Will of the Abyss starts yelling at him about how he should be dead, then starts to cry. She looks at Break and asks who he is, then screams that it is teatime. She says she can't wait for her playdate with Jack, and Vincent tells her that Jack is dead. He blames Sabrie, Jack's death, and he and Gil ending up in the Abyss on her. She has a breakdown and her whole room/dimension starts falling apart. Vince welcomes it with laughter, saying he'd be normal if everything broke. At the last minute, Break promises her anything if she'll just make it so his past was changed. She hears his cry and grants his wish. Suddenly, the scene flashes to Jack's memory, saying that Alice would switch her tastes constantly as if she were a different person. Alice says that her twin sister is the Will of the Abyss. After obtaining this information, Lord Barma wants to take Alice and Break into custody, but Oz won't let him. The group goes back to the mansion and on the way, Break tells Oz, Alice, and Gil the rest of his past; He had been a knight named Kevin Regnard. The nobles he served fifty years earlier, the Sinclair family, had been killed bandits while he was away. The only survivor was the young Sinclair daughter, who had been with him. Blaming himself, and wanting to change the past and save his master, he formed an illegal contract. After the Will of the Abyss acknowledged his request to change his past, he woke up in the Reinsworth house thirty years later, where he found out that the Sinclairs had escaped the bandits' attack, as he had wished; However, they were all killed, including the daughter, a few years later by a rival noble family. He expresses remorse for his actions, saying that he shouldn't have tried to change the past. Gil asks him if he hates the Will of the Abyss, to which he replies that he does, but that his hatred isn't justified, as he was the one who made the wish.
23	"A Warp in the World"; Transliteration: "Kishimu Sekai" (Japanese: 軋む世界)	September 10, 2009
Oz, Alice, and Gil have been seeking chains for memory fragments for a while now with no success. Ada visits Oz during her holiday break and finds dozens of Pandora guards escorting him; Jack had ordered for Oz's protection when he last appeared (Episode 16). Oscar sees Ada making eyes at Gil and drags him off. Break directs the guards to another task, since he doesn't like being watched. Sharon believes that if the Baskervilles wanted Oz dead, they would have taken care of him already. Gil visits Vincent to ask about Sabrie, but Vincent denies remembering anything. Independent of Gil, Oz and Alice also try to see Vincent but are immediately turned away by Echo. Vincent tells Echo that no one needs to know what happened. To find more clues, Oz and co. visit the mansion where his coming of age ceremony was interrupted. He reenacts the ceremony in the hopes of discovering something. Trump cards appear and attack Alice, who defeats them. The city of Reveille is on fire.
24	"Kyrie"; Transliteration: "Awaremi no Sanka" (Japanese: 憐れみの讃歌)	September 17, 2009
The group hurries to the burning city, where a large-scale Chain attack is taking place. Gil thinks the Baskervilles are to blame for the Chains coming loose, but Alice tells them the Will of the Abyss is calling out, which is upsetting the balance of the Abyss. Gil unleashes Alice's B. Rabbit powers and each of them joins the fight. Oz saves a boy from a burning building and as the building falls to the ground, Alice saves them and the boy is returned to his mother. Oz collapses and Alice reverts to her other form since she had used too much power. Break says it is time to get serious and takes out his Mad Hatter, which causes the Chains in the area to crumble away. After every Chain is gone, Break falls to the ground. While Oz and Alice sit in an abandoned house and talk, a Chain erupts from the floor. Alice and Oz run away and bump into the Baskervilles, who help them destroy the Chain. When asked why, the Baskervilles claimed to be under orders, and said they would need Oz's power. Many more Chains appear and are killed by the Chains of Pandora, which finally come. The reinforcements are soon killed by one giant Chain. B. Rabbit faces the Chain but is unable to defeat it, and in the end the Chain turns to stone and Oz and Alice see one of Alice's memories.
25	"Beyond the Winding Road"; Transliteration: "Hitei no Kanata e" (Japanese: 否定の彼方へ)	September 24, 2009
Oscar tells Oz that his father has been out of reach for ten years. Sharon and Break discuss what happened earlier, and Break says Oz really does have the power to control the Abyss and that the Will of the Abyss had a "special feeling" towards Jack. Break tells Sharon that there's a rumor about Oz being the reincarnation of Jack, and he also tells her they may have to reconsider the Baskerville's true intentions. Gil, Oz, Alice, and Oscar return to Oz's home and at dinner Oscar reveals that before Oz's father disappeared, he signed a contract with a Chain called Griffin, which turns out to be the same Chain that dragged Oz into the Abyss. Oz locks himself in his room, and when Alice and Gil come, Oz questions who he is and Alice says that's the reason they're working together - to find out who they are. Oz wants to see his father again and Gil finds out that the Baskervilles are staying in Sabrie. On the way there, Oz says that everything he has done so far may have been wrong. When they reach Sabrie, the group finds the Baskervilles and Griffin. The four almost get dragged into the Abyss, but Oz unleashes B. Rabbit's powers on his own, and they both make the Griffin disappear. Oz tells his father that he will continue to be himself no matter what happens and no matter what others think of him. Oz's father adds after they leave that it isn't fun to deny one person's existence, but that Oz cannot be allowed to exist. The last picture shows the pocketwatch back on the grave.
