= Lacie Waldon =

American writer

Lacie Waldon is an American author of fiction from Nashville, Tennessee.

Buzzfeed named her debut book The Layover in its summer 2021 romance novel list. USA Today called it a "favorite [rom-com] of 2021".

== Selected works ==
- The Layover. Putnam, 2021.
- From the Jump. Putnam, 2022.
- The Only Game in Town. Putnam, 2023.
