= Samuel J. Tilden =

Governor of New York from 1875 to 1876

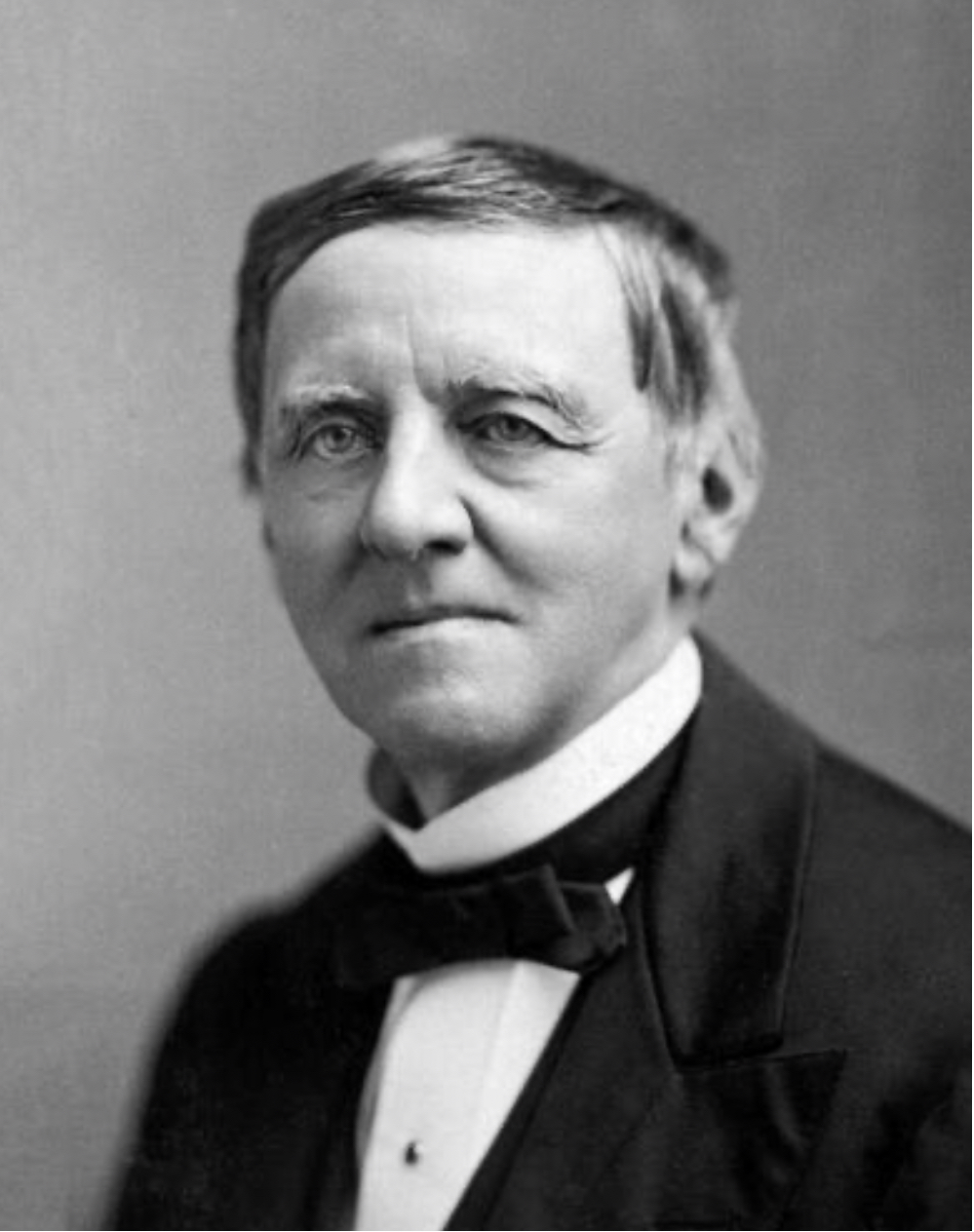
- Tilden in c. 1870

25th Governor of New York
- In office January 1, 1875 – December 31, 1876
- Lieutenant: William Dorsheimer
- Preceded by: John Adams Dix
- Succeeded by: Lucius Robinson

Member of the New York State Assembly from New York County's 18th District
- In office January 1, 1872 – December 31, 1872
- Preceded by: Leander Buck
- Succeeded by: Barney Biglin

Chair of the New York Democratic Party
- In office August 1866 – September 1874
- Preceded by: Dean Richmond
- Succeeded by: Allen C. Beach

Member of the New York State Assembly from New York County
- In office January 1, 1846 – December 31, 1847 Serving with 13 others (Multi-member district)

Corporation Counsel of New York City
- In office 1843–1844
- Preceded by: Alexander W. Bradford
- Succeeded by: Stephen Sammons

Personal details
- Born: Samuel Jones Tilden; February 9, 1814 New Lebanon, New York, U.S.
- Died: August 4, 1886 (aged 72) Yonkers, New York, U.S.
- Resting place: Gov. Samuel J. Tilden Monument, Cemetery of the Evergreens; New Lebanon, New York, U.S.
- Party: Democratic
- Other political affiliations: Free Soil (1848)
- Education: Yale University; New York University

Samuel Jones Tilden (February 9, 1814 – August 4, 1886) was an American politician who served as the 25th governor of New York and was the Democratic nominee in the disputed 1876 United States presidential election.

Tilden was born in 1814 into a wealthy family in New Lebanon, New York. Attracted to politics at a young age, he became a protégé of Martin Van Buren. After studying at Yale University and the New York University School of Law, Tilden began a legal career in New York City, becoming a noted corporate lawyer. He served in the New York State Assembly and helped launch Van Buren's candidacy in the 1848 United States presidential election. A War Democrat who opposed slavery, Tilden opposed Abraham Lincoln in the 1860 presidential election, but later supported him and the Union during the Civil War. Afterward, he became the chairman of the New York State Democratic Committee and managed Horatio Seymour's campaign in the 1868 presidential election.

Tilden initially cooperated with the state party's Tammany Hall faction, but he broke with them in 1871 due to boss William M. Tweed's rampant corruption. Tilden won election as governor of New York in 1874, and in that office, he helped break up the Canal Ring. His battle against public corruption, along with his personal fortune and electoral success in New York, made him the leading candidate for the Democratic nomination for president in 1876. Tilden was selected as the party's nominee on the second ballot. In the general election, Tilden faced Republican nominee Rutherford B. Hayes. Tilden focused his campaign on civil service reform, support for the gold standard, and opposition to high taxes, but many of his supporters were more concerned with ending Reconstruction in the Southern United States.

Tilden won the popular vote by 250,000 votes but 20 electoral votes were in dispute, leaving Tilden and Hayes without a majority of the electoral vote. As Tilden had won 184 electoral votes, one vote shy of a majority, a Hayes victory required that he sweep all of the disputed electoral votes. Against Tilden's wishes, Congress appointed the bipartisan Electoral Commission to settle the controversy. Republicans had a one-seat advantage on the Commission, and decided in a series of party-line rulings that Hayes had won all of the disputed electoral votes. In the Compromise of 1877, Democratic leaders agreed to accept Hayes as the victor in return for the end of Reconstruction. Tilden is the only presidential candidate to win an absolute majority of the popular vote while losing the election. (Note: Four candidates have lost a presidential election despite garnering a plurality of the popular vote: Andrew Jackson in 1824 (41.4%); Grover Cleveland in 1888 (48.6%); Al Gore in 2000 (48.4%); and Hillary Clinton in 2016 (48.2%).) He subsequently left politics and died in 1886.

== Early life ==
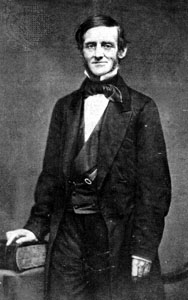
Tilden as a young man

Tilden was born in New Lebanon, New York, the youngest son of Elam Tilden and Polly Jones Tilden. He was descended from Nathaniel Tilden, an early English settler who came to North America in 1634. His father and other family members were the makers of patent medicines including Tilden's Extract, a popular concoction of the 1800s and early 1900s that was derived from cannabis. Tilden's father maintained relationships with many influential New York politicians, including President Martin Van Buren, who became Tilden's political idol. Tilden was frequently in poor health during his youth, and he spent much of his time studying politics and reading works such as The Wealth of Nations. Tilden's health troubles prevented him from regularly attending school, and he dropped out of Williams Academy after three months and Yale College after a single term in 1834–1835.

Likely motivated by a family friendship with Benjamin Franklin Butler, then serving as a professor at New York University School of Law, Tilden enrolled there to resume his studies and continued to attend intermittently from 1838 to 1841. While studying at NYU, Tilden also read law in the office of attorney John W. Edmonds. He was admitted to the bar in 1841 and became a skilled corporate lawyer. Tilden affiliated with the Democratic Party and frequently campaigned on behalf of Van Buren and other Democratic candidates.

== Early political career ==
In 1843, Tilden was appointed as New York City's corporation counsel, a reward for his campaign work for Governor William C. Bouck. Tilden handled hundreds of cases on behalf of the city, but was forced out of office in 1844 after New York City elected a Whig mayor. He served as a delegate to the 1844 Democratic National Convention, which rejected Van Buren and nominated James K. Polk for president. At the urging of Governor Silas Wright, Tilden won election to the New York State Assembly. He became a key ally to Wright and helped end the Anti-Rent War by passing a compromise land bill that defused tensions between tenant farmers and their landlords. After serving as a delegate to the 1846 New York State Constitutional Convention, Tilden left public office to focus on his legal practice, where he gained a national reputation as a "financial physician" for struggling railroads. Tilden's successful legal practice, combined with shrewd investments, made him rich. His success at money management and investing caused many of his friends, relatives, and political allies, including Van Buren, to allow Tilden to manage their finances.

Tilden was a leader of the "Barnburners", an anti-slavery faction of the New York Democratic Party that arose during the debate over the Wilmot Proviso. Like other Barnburners, Tilden sought to prevent the spread of slavery into the land acquired from Mexico in the Treaty of Guadalupe Hidalgo. He helped organize the 1848 Free Soil Convention, which nominated Van Buren for president. Van Buren's candidacy in the 1848 presidential election drew votes from Democratic nominee Lewis Cass in New York, which played a role in the victory of Whig nominee Zachary Taylor. Unlike many other anti-slavery Democrats, Tilden did not join the Republican Party in the 1850s, but he did not have close relations with Democratic presidents Franklin Pierce and James Buchanan. In 1855, Tilden was the unsuccessful state attorney general candidate of the "Soft" faction of Barnburners, which favored compromise and reconciliation with the Democratic Party. In 1859, after he lost an election to serve as New York City's corporation counsel, Tilden announced that he was "out of politics."

In the 1860 presidential election, Tilden strongly opposed the candidacy of Republican presidential nominee Abraham Lincoln. He warned that the election of Lincoln could lead to the secession of the South and a subsequent civil war. Tilden initially opposed using force to prevent secession, but he supported the Union after the outbreak of the American Civil War. Tilden served as the manager of Horatio Seymour's successful 1862 campaign for governor, and played a key role in securing the presidential nomination for George B. McClellan at the 1864 Democratic National Convention.

In 1867, Tilden received the honorary degree of LL.D. from New York University. He was also chosen as a delegate to that year's state constitutional convention.

== State party leader ==
Following the end of the Civil War, Tilden won the election for chairman of the New York State Democratic Committee. He served as Seymour's campaign chairman in the 1868 presidential election, but Seymour lost the election to Republican nominee Ulysses S. Grant. After the election, Tilden broke with William M. Tweed, the leader of the Tammany Hall political machine. Through bribery, patronage, and control of Irish-American voters, Tweed and his allies had become the dominant power in both New York City and the state of New York. In 1871, former Tammany associate James O'Brien leaked Tweed's account books to the New York Times. The Times subsequently began a public crusade against Tammany Hall, and Tilden launched an investigation into Tweed's bank records. Tilden ran for the New York State Assembly as part of a slate of anti-Tammany Democrats; at the state party convention, he declared that it was "time to proclaim that whoever plunders the people, though he steal the livery of heaven to serve the devil in, is no Democrat." (Note: Tilden was referencing The Course of Time, an 1827 poem by Robert Pollok. In Pollok's work, a man "stole the livery of the court of Heaven to serve the Devil in." In other words, putting on a veneer of respectability to hide his corruption.) The anti-Tammany Democrats, including Tilden, won a major victory in the 1871 state elections, and Tweed was indicted on 120 counts of fraud and other violations. After the election, Tweed fled the state, but he was eventually extradited back to New York, where he died in prison in 1878.

Tilden's role in taking down Tweed bolstered his popularity, and he was elected governor of New York in 1874. As governor, he continued to focus on rooting out corruption. He helped to break up the "Canal Ring", a bipartisan group of state and local officials who had enriched themselves by overcharging for the maintenance of the New York State Canal System. Tilden gained a national reputation as a reform governor, a valuable asset given the number of scandals that had come into public view during the presidency of Ulysses S. Grant.

In 1875, Tilden received an honorary LL.D. from Yale University. At the same time, Yale also enrolled him as a graduate of the Class of 1837 and he received his Bachelor of Arts degree.

== Presidential election of 1876 ==
=== Democratic nomination ===
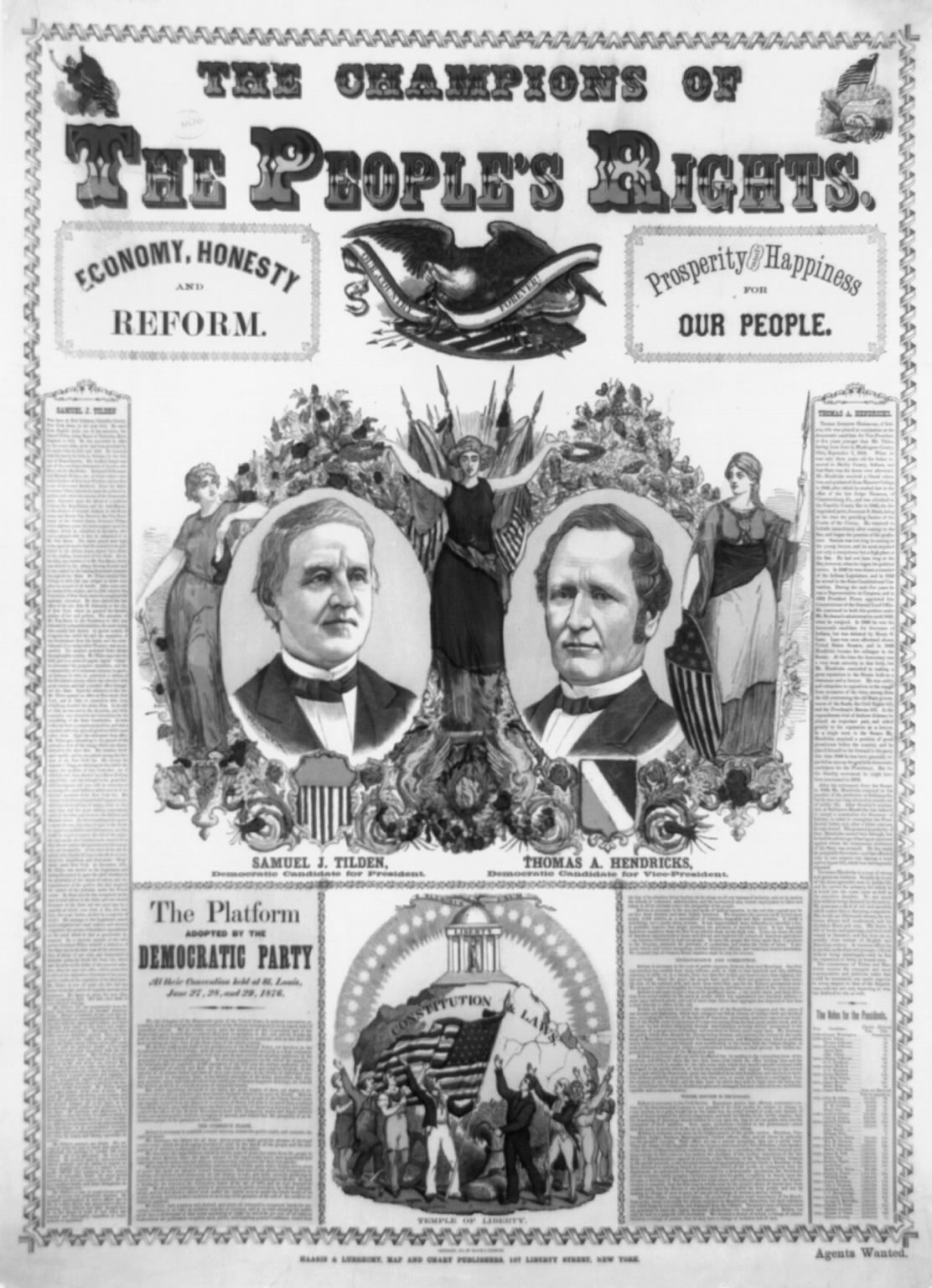
Campaign poster for the election of 1876

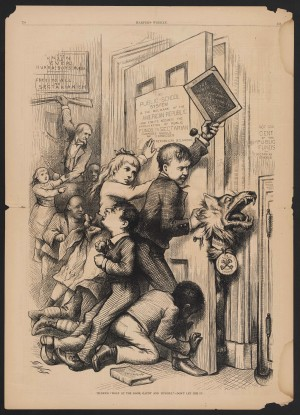
Wolf at the Door, Gaunt and Hungry." Don't let him in. Thomas Nast cartoon against both Samuel Tilden and the Roman Catholic Church (i.e. If the Democrat Tilden was elected President the Public School system would be "Endangered" by the Roman Catholic Church.) Published in Harper's Weekly, September 16, 1876

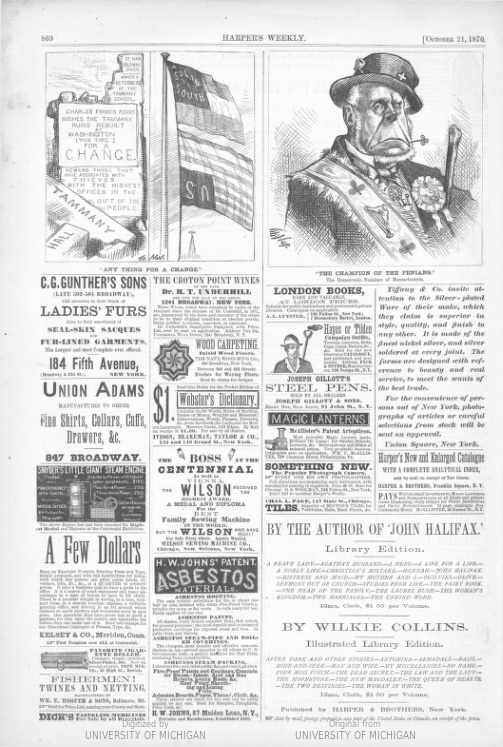
Harper's Weekly October 21, 1876, p.860 Thomas Nast Cartoons charging that reformer Samuel Tilden was supported by Northern Democratic Tammy Hall and Southern Democrats and right a Satiric cartoon of Charles Francis Adams Sr a Boston Brahmin being supported by the Irish of Massachusetts

By the time of the June 1876 Democratic National Convention, Tilden had emerged as the front-runner for the Democratic nomination in the 1876 presidential election. Tilden's appeal to the national party was based on his reputation for reform and his electoral success in the country's most populous state. He was also a skilled organizer whose canvassing system and field knowledge were so thorough that, months before the 1874 election, he had predicted his own winning margin accurately to within 300 votes. Tilden further bolstered his presidential candidacy through a nationwide newspaper advertising campaign. As many Democrats expected that their party would win the presidency after four consecutive defeats, Tilden faced competition from some of the party's most prominent leaders, including Thomas F. Bayard, Allen G. Thurman, Thomas A. Hendricks, and General Winfield Scott Hancock.

During the difficult economic times of the Panic of 1873, the major ideological divide in the Democratic Party concerned the issue of currency. Many "soft money" Democrats wanted Congress to repeal the Specie Payment Resumption Act and authorize the printing of more greenbacks, banknotes that had first been printed during the Civil War. The printing of more greenbacks would result in inflation and potentially benefit farmers by raising prices and helping them pay down their debts. Like most Republicans and "hard money" members of the conservative business establishment, Tilden believed that the termination of greenback circulation (which would return the country to the gold standard) was the best way to solve the ongoing economic crisis. Tilden's lieutenants at the Democratic National Convention emphasized Tilden's reform credentials above all else, but they also ensured that the party platform endorsed Tilden's hard money views.

Tilden won a majority of the votes cast on the first presidential ballot of the convention (404.5), but fell short of the two-thirds majority (492) required to win the Democratic presidential nomination. His closest rival was Hendricks, who had the support of New York party boss John Kelly and the soft money faction of Democrats. Tilden won the necessary two-thirds on the second presidential ballot, and the convention then voted to make his nomination unanimous. Delegates unanimously chose Hendricks as Tilden's running mate, providing a balance between the hard money and soft money factions. Though the Republicans had nominated a ticket led by Rutherford B. Hayes of Ohio, another governor who had established a reputation for honest governance, Tilden was widely regarded as the favorite in the general election.

=== General election ===
In the aftermath of the 1876 election, the electoral votes of four states were disputed.

Per tradition, both Tilden and Hayes avoided publicly campaigning for president, leaving that task to their supporters; Tilden appointed Abram Hewitt to lead his campaign. The Republican campaign established a major cash advantage, partly because Tilden refused to contribute much of his personal fortune to the campaign. The Democrats campaigned on the theme of "retrenchment and reform" and attacked the "corrupt centralism" of the Grant administration. Tilden blamed high taxes and the Grant administration for the economic downturn, and, like Hayes, promised civil service reform and hard money policies. Meanwhile, Republicans focused on their party's identification with Lincoln and the Union cause in the Civil War; many Republicans still associated the Democratic Party with slavery and disunion. Rebutting Republican charges, Tilden categorically denied that he had any intention of compensating the South for any slaves emancipated or losses suffered during the Civil War. For their part, many Democrats cared little for Tilden's emphasis on reform, and were instead focused on ending sixteen years of Republican leadership. Southern Democrats especially hoped to end Reconstruction and gain control of South Carolina, Florida, and Louisiana, the last three "unredeemed" Southern states. Southern whites, who overwhelmingly favored Tilden, used violence and intimidation to suppress the turnout of Republican-leaning African-American voters. Tilden worked to distance himself from violent encounters like the Hamburg massacre, in which disgruntled Southern whites clashed with the Republican-led government of South Carolina.

Both campaigns considered New York, Ohio, and Indiana to be the key swing states, but the campaigns also focused on several smaller states, including the three unredeemed Southern states. Ultimately, Hayes swept the West and won much of the North, but Tilden carried the closely contested Northern states of New York, New Jersey, Indiana, and Connecticut, swept the border states, and carried most of the South. He had won a majority of the popular vote and tallied clear victories in seventeen states, leaving him one electoral vote short of a majority. On November 6, the day after election day, most major newspapers reported that Tilden had won the election; however, Hayes still had a narrow path to victory if he could sweep the electoral votes of Florida, South Carolina, and Louisiana. Hayes refused to formally concede, but told members of the press that he was "of the opinion that the Democrats have carried the country and elected Tilden." Tilden, meanwhile, urged his alarmed followers, many of whom believed that the Republicans were attempting to steal the election, to remain calm and refrain from violence. Both parties feared the possibility that a dispute over the election would lead to armed conflict; Tilden discussed appointing General George B. McClellan as his military assistant, while President Grant ordered army and naval units to reinforce Washington.

=== Post-election controversy ===
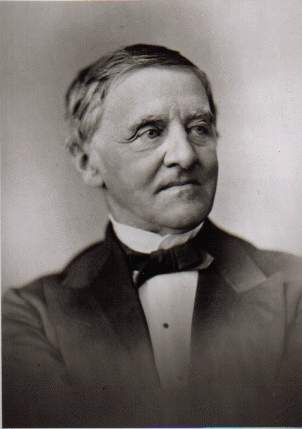
Tilden

With the election in doubt, each party sent some of their most prominent leaders to monitor the election process in the three disputed Southern states. Initial election returns showed that Hayes had carried South Carolina by several hundred votes, but that Tilden had won Florida by 91 votes and Louisiana by over 6,000. Republicans controlled the bodies charged with determining the validity of election results in all three states. On November 22, the South Carolina canvassing board adjourned after declaring that Hayes had won the state's electoral votes. On December 4, the Louisiana canvassing board announced that it had thrown out 15,623 votes due to "systemic intimidation", leaving Hayes as the winner of all of the state's electoral votes.

Early on the morning of December 6, the day the Electoral College was scheduled to convene, the Florida canvassing board announced that Hayes had won the state by a margin of 924 votes. Democrats challenged the results in all three contested Southern states. Another controversy had arisen in Oregon, where a Hayes elector, John Watts, resigned because his simultaneous service as a presidential elector and as a low-ranking official in the Post Office violated the United States Constitution. After Watts resigned, the state's Democratic governor appointed an elector to fill the vacancy, while, separately, the state's two remaining Hayes electors chose a third elector to fill the vacancy caused by Watts's resignation.

On December 6, the members of the Electoral College met in Washington, D.C., but the disputes in four states prevented a conclusive vote for president. With the Electoral College unable to select a president, the disputed election became an issue for Congress to settle; Republicans controlled the Senate, while Democrats controlled the House. The vague wording of the Constitution gave rise to further controversy, as Republicans held that Thomas W. Ferry, a Republican senator from Michigan and the president pro tempore of the United States Senate, could determine the validity of the disputed electoral votes. Democrats argued that Ferry could only count the votes that were not disputed; in such a scenario, neither candidate would have an electoral vote majority, necessitating a contingent election in the United States House of Representatives. Since Democrats controlled a majority of the state delegations in the House, they would be able to elect Tilden as president in a contingent election. In response to the controversy, Tilden compiled his own study of electoral procedures in the previous 22 presidential elections. He delivered the study to every sitting member of Congress, but congressional Republicans were not swayed by Tilden's argument that history supported the Democratic position on the election returns. He continued to call for calm, and rejected Abram Hewitt's suggestion that he ask his supporters to engage in mass public demonstrations.

=== Electoral Commission ===
On January 26, both houses of Congress agreed to establish the 15-member Electoral Commission to settle the dispute over the contested electoral votes. The commission consisted of five Democratic members of Congress, five Republican members of Congress, and five justices of the Supreme Court of the United States. Of the Supreme Court justices, two were to be Democrats, two were to be Republicans, and the fifth justice would be selected by the other four justices. Tilden opposed the creation of the Electoral Commission because he still hoped to force a contingent election in the House of Representatives, but he was unable to prevent Democratic congressmen from voting for the establishment of the commission. Most had expected that the fifth justice on the commission would be Associate Justice David Davis, a political independent, but Davis refused to serve on the commission after he accepted election to the Senate. Another associate justice, Republican Joseph P. Bradley, was instead chosen as the fifth justice on the Electoral Commission. In a series of 8-to-7, party-line decisions, the Electoral Commission voted to award all of the contested electoral votes to Hayes.

Even after the Electoral Commission delivered its rulings, the House of Representatives could have blocked the inauguration of Hayes by refusing to certify the results. Though some House Democrats hoped to do so, they were unable, as many House Democrats joined with their Republican colleagues in voting to accept. During the proceedings of the Electoral Commission, high-ranking members of both parties had discussed the possibility of declaring Hayes the winner in exchange for the removal of all federal troops from the South. The Compromise of 1877, as it became known, may have played a role in preventing the House from challenging the Electoral Commission's rulings, although author Roy Morris Jr. argues that the compromise "was more a mutual concession of the obvious than a device for controlling larger events." Some other historians, including C. Vann Woodward, have argued that the Compromise of 1877 played the decisive role in determining the outcome of the election. On March 2, two days before the end of Grant's term, Congress declared Hayes the victor of the 1876 presidential election. Hayes took office on March 4, and withdrew the last federal soldiers from the South in April 1877, bringing an end to the Reconstruction Era.

Some Democrats urged Tilden to reject the results and take the presidential oath of office, but Tilden declined to do so. On March 3, the House passed a resolution declaring Tilden the "duly elected President of the United States," but this had no legal effect. Tilden himself stated that, "I can retire to private life with the consciousness that I shall receive from posterity the credit of having been elected to the highest position in the gift of the people, without any of the cares and responsibilities of the office." Tilden was the second individual, after Andrew Jackson in 1824, to lose a presidential election despite winning at least a plurality of the popular vote. Tilden remains the only individual to lose a presidential election while winning an outright majority of the popular vote.

== Later life ==
=== Potter Committee ===
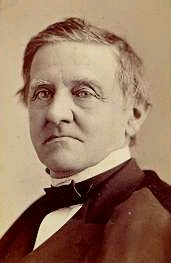
Tilden

In 1878, Democratic Congressman Clarkson Nott Potter convinced the House of Representatives to create a committee to investigate allegations of fraud and corruption in the 1876 election. Potter was appointed as the head of the commission, which Democrats hoped would implicate Hayes and damage the Republican Party in the next presidential election. Rather than produce conclusive evidence of Republican malfeasance, the committee uncovered conflicting evidence that reflected poorly on election and campaign officials of both parties. For ten months beginning in May 1878, the Potter Committee subpoenaed all telegrams sent by political operatives during the election dispute. 29,275 telegrams had been sent, but all save 641 had been routinely destroyed by Western Union. The remaining telegrams were in cipher, as was common with business and political communication in the telegraph era. New York Herald Tribune editor Whitelaw Reid obtained and deciphered many of the telegrams and, in October 1878, he published the story of the Democratic efforts to sway election officials through bribery and other means. The revelation of the bribery attempts undercut the Democratic Party's argument that Tilden had been cheated out of the presidency. A congressional committee's investigation into the Cipher Telegrams cleared Tilden of any personal wrongdoing, but the allegations damaged his national standing.

=== Elections of 1880 and 1884 ===
After the controversy over the election of 1876, Tilden became the presumptive Democratic candidate ahead of the 1880 presidential election. He declined to run for another term as governor in 1879, focusing instead on building support for the 1880 presidential nomination. The revelations of the Potter Committee, along with Tilden's persistent health issues, both damaged Tilden's national standing, but his superior political organization and personal fortune ensured that he remained a serious contender for the Democratic nomination. Tilden's standing with the party slipped further following the Republican victory in the 1879 New York gubernatorial election, where a revitalized Tammany Hall organization split from the regular Democratic party in a patronage dispute with Tilden's faction. In the months before the 1880 Democratic National Convention, rumors about Tilden's intentions circulated wildly, but Tilden refused to definitively state whether or not he would seek the Democratic nomination.

As the New York delegation left for the national convention in Cincinnati, Tilden gave a letter to one of his chief supporters, Daniel Manning, suggesting that his health might force him to decline the nomination. Tilden hoped to be nominated, but only if he was the unanimous choice of the convention; if not, Manning was entrusted to make the contents of Tilden's letter available to the New York delegation. The New York delegation interpreted the letter as a notice of withdrawal, and the delegates began looking for a new candidate, eventually settling on Speaker of the House Samuel J. Randall. Ultimately, the party nominated Winfield Scott Hancock, who lost the election to James A Garfield.

Though many Democrats favored Tilden for the party's nomination in the 1884 presidential election, Tilden once again declined to run due to poor health. He endorsed New York Governor Grover Cleveland, who won the Democratic nomination and went on to defeat James G. Blaine in the general election.

=== Retirement and death ===
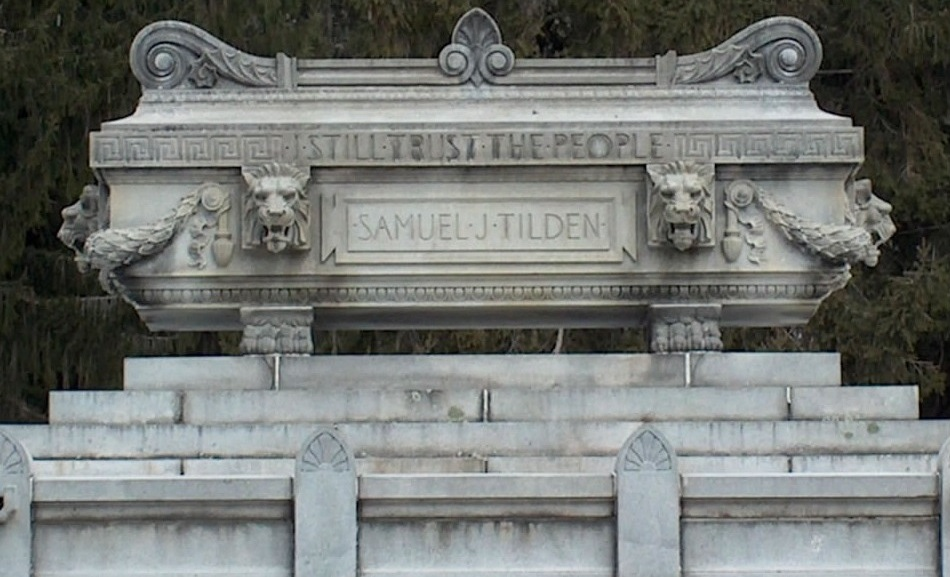
Tilden memorial, New Lebanon, New York

Tilden retired in the early 1880s, living as a near-recluse at his 110-acre (0.45 km^{2}) estate, Greystone (now part of Untermyer Park and Gardens) in Yonkers, New York. He died a bachelor at Greystone on August 4, 1886, at the age of 72. He is buried at Cemetery of the Evergreens in New Lebanon, Columbia County, New York. In reference to the 1876 election, Tilden's gravestone bears the words, "I Still Trust The People".

Of his fortune, estimated at $7 million (equivalent to $250.83 million in 2025), $4 million (equivalent to $143.33 million in 2025) was bequeathed for the establishment and maintenance of a free public library and reading-room in the City of New York; but, as the will was successfully contested by relatives, only about $3 million (equivalent to $107.5 million in 2025) was applied to its original purpose. In 1895, the Tilden Trust was combined with the Astor and Lenox libraries to found the New York Public Library, and the building bears his name on its front.

== Legacy ==
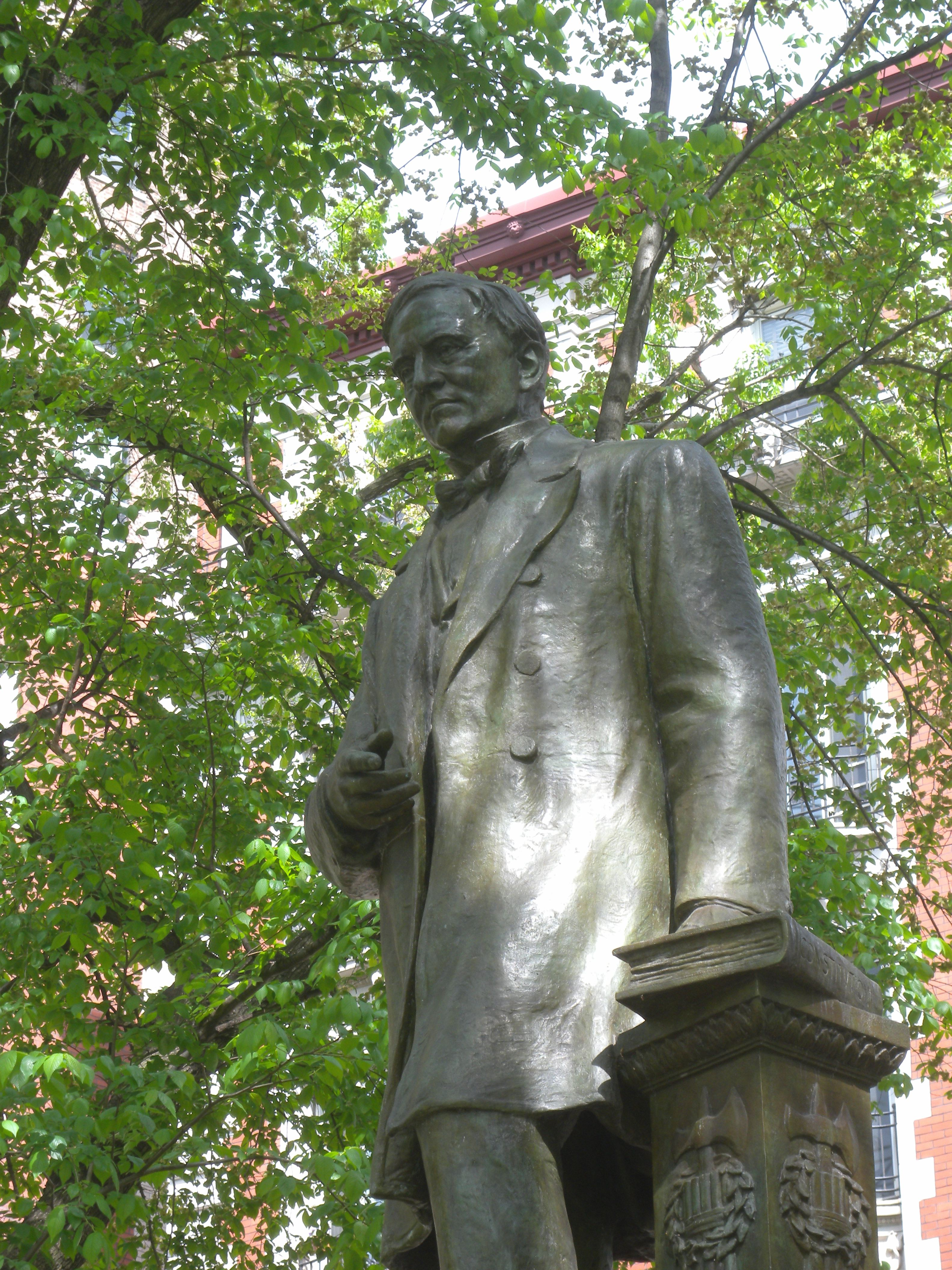
Statue in New York City

The Samuel J. Tilden House at 15 Gramercy Park South, which he owned from 1860 until his death, is now used by the National Arts Club. Tilden's Greystone property is now known as Untermyer Park; it was added to the National Register of Historic Places in 1974. Several places have been named for Tilden, including Tilden, Wisconsin, Tilden, Nebraska, Tilden, Texas, Tilden Township, Pennsylvania, and Grove Park-Tilden Township, Minnesota. The Gov. Samuel J. Tilden Monument was added to the National Register of Historic Places in 2006. Other things named for Tilden include Samuel J. Tilden High School, Fort Tilden, New York, and the Root-Tilden-Kern Scholarship. SS Samuel J. Tilden was a World War II Liberty Ship; she was sunk in the German air raid on Bari on December 2, 1943.

== See also ==
- Conservative Democrat
- Compromise of 1877

== Bibliography ==
=== Secondary sources ===
- Archdeacon, Thomas J. (1978). "The Erie Canal Ring, Samuel J. Tilden, and the Democratic Party". New York History. 59 (4): 408–429. JSTOR 23170015.
- Bigelow, John (2009) [1895]. Oldaker, Nikki (ed.). The Life of Samuel J. Tilden (Revised ed.). Show Biz East Productions. ISBN 978-0978669805.
- Clancy, Herbert J. (1958). The Presidential Election of 1880. Loyola University Press. ISBN 978-1-258-19190-0.
- Oldaker, Nikki (2006). Samuel Tilden the Real 19th President. Show Biz East Productions. ISBN 978-0978669805.
- Earle, Jonathan Halperin (2004). Jacksonian Antislavery and the Politics of Free Soil, 1824-1854. University of North Carolina Press. ISBN 9780807855553.
- Flick, Alexander C. (1939). Samuel J. Tilden: A Study in Political Sagacity. Kennikat Press. OCLC 673301.
- Guenther, Karen (1983). "Potter Committee Investigation of the Disputed Election of 1876". The Florida Historical Quarterly. 61 (3): 281–295. JSTOR 30149125.
- Hirsch, Mark D. (1951). "Samuel J. Tilden: The Story of a Lost Opportunity". The American Historical Review. 56 (4): 788–802. doi:10.2307/1851984. JSTOR 1851984.
- Holt, Michael F. (2008). By One Vote: The Disputed Presidential Election of 1876. University Press of Kansas. ISBN 9780700616084.
- Kahn, David (1996). The Codebreakers: The Comprehensive History of Secret Communication from Ancient Times to the Internet (Revised ed.). Scribner. ISBN 978-0684831305.
- Kelley, Robert (1964). "The Thought and Character of Samuel J. Tilden: The Democrat As Inheritor". The Historian. 26 (2): 176–205. doi:10.1111/j.1540-6563.1964.tb00244.x.
- Morris, Roy (2003). Fraud of the Century: Rutherford B. Hayes, Samuel Tilden, and the Stolen Election of 1876. Simon & Schuster. ISBN 0-7432-2386-1.
- Polakoff, Keith Ian (1973). The Politics of Inertia: The Election of 1876 and the End of Reconstruction. Louisiana State University Press. ISBN 978-0807102107.
- Quigley, David. Second Founding: New York City, Reconstruction, and the Making of American Democracy. Hill and Wang (2004) ISBN 978-0-8090-8513-2
- Robinson, Lloyd (2001). The Stolen Election: Hayes Versus Tilden—1876. Forge Books. ISBN 978-0765302069.
- Severn, Bill (1968). Samuel J. Tilden and the Stolen Election. I. Washburn. OCLC 448909.
- Rehnquist, William (2004). Centennial Crisis: The Disputed Election of 1876. Knopf. ISBN 978-0375413872.
- White, Richard (2017). The Republic for which it Stands: The United States During Reconstruction and the Gilded Age, 1865-1896. Oxford University Press. ISBN 9780199735815.

=== Primary sources ===
- Letters and Literary Memorials of Samuel J. Tilden. Edited by John Bigelow. Volume I (1908) online edition
- Letters and Literary Memorials of Samuel J. Tilden. Edited by John Bigelow. Volume II (1908) online edition
- The Writings and Speeches of Samuel J. Tilden. Edited by John Bigelow. Volume I (1885) online edition
- The Writings and Speeches of Samuel J. Tilden. Edited by John Bigelow. Volume II (1885) online edition

Party political offices
Preceded by Dean Richmond	Chair of the New York Democratic Party; 1866–1874	Succeeded by Allen C. Beach
Preceded by Francis Kernan	Democratic nominee for Governor of New York; 1874	Succeeded by Lucius Robinson
Preceded by Horace Greeley	Democratic nominee for President of the United States; 1876	Succeeded by Winfield Scott Hancock
New York State Assembly
Preceded by Leander Buck	Member of the New York Assembly from New York County's 18th district 1872	Succeeded by Barney Biglin
Political offices
Preceded by John Adams Dix	Governor of New York; 1875–1876	Succeeded by Lucius Robinson
