= Frances E. Townsley =

Second woman ordained as a Baptist minister

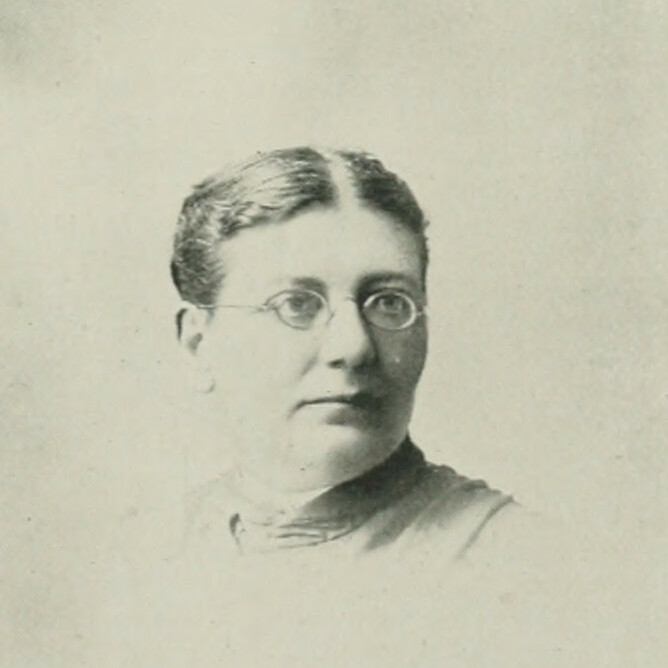
- Photo from "A Woman of the Century"

Personal life
- Born: Frances ("Fannie") Eleanor Townsley; September 13, 1850 Albany, New York, U.S.
- Died: 1909 (aged 58–59)
- Notable works: A Pilgrim Maid; The Sabbath Training of the Child for Eternity
- Education: Wheaton College
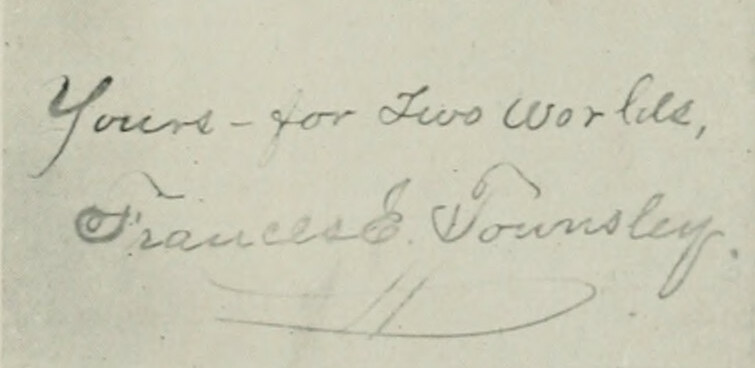
- Signature

Religious life
- Religion: Northern Baptist
- Profession: minister; evangelical preacher; lecturer; writer
- Ordination: April 1885

Frances E. Townsley (September 13, 1850 – 1909) was an American Baptist minister and evangelical preacher, as well as a lecturer and a writer in prose and verse. She was the second-known woman to be ordained in the Baptist faith, and the first then-Northern Baptist woman minister to be thus credentialed. After ordination, she endured criticism and resistance.

== Early life and education ==
Frances ("Fannie") Eleanor Townsley was born in Albany, New York, September 13, 1850. (Note: According to Larsen (2017), Townsley was born in 1849.) Her father was Gad Townsley, a commission merchant, and a strong abolitionist who died during a cholera epidemic. Her mother Charlotte Davis Townsley, in early widowhood, would work till midnight and took in boarders to support the family; she also wrote unpublished prose and verse.

During her early years, the child lived in Shelburne Falls, Massachusetts. The public-school education she received was excellent. Once, when asked where she was educated, she said: "Partly in a village academy, partly in Wheaton College, partly in the studies of individual pastors, mainly in the University of Sorrow."

Townsley's "call to preach" was sudden, positive, and undoubted. She spoke her first piece when five years old, the Psalm 23. She owed much of her training as a public speaker to her mother. Among the things committed to memory during the first ten years of her life were Nathaniel Parker Willis' Sacred Poems, parts of John Milton's Paradise Lost, Robert Pollok's The Course of Time, Richard Chenevix Trench's The Miracles and Parables of Christ, Jesus' "Sermon on the Mount", as well as Hebrew poetry and prophecy, and many patriotic selections. She became a professing Christian before she was eighteen years old, after turbulent struggles, mental and spiritual.

== Career ==
After completing her education at Wheaton College, Townsley became a teacher.

She became a preacher against her previous ideas of the woman's sphere. She was licensed by the Shelburne Falls, Massachusetts, Baptist Church in 1874, after preaching for a year. After twelve years of work as an evangelist in Maine, New Hampshire, Vermont, Massachusetts, New York, Ohio, Illinois, Michigan, Minnesota, South Dakota, and Nebraska, she was ordained by a council of Baptist Churches in April 1885, in Fairfield, Nebraska. She was State evangelist for the Nebraska Woman's Christian Temperance Union, serving as an editor of the organization's The Union Signal. While residing in Ashland, Nebraska, she served as pastor of the Immanuel Baptist Church. Removing to Maywood, Illinois by the turn of the century, the Women's National Sabbath Alliance bestowed an award on one of Townsley's essays.

From 1898 until 1902, she was in Vassar, Michigan where she served as pastor. Retiring because of poor health, she preached, taught, and led reform work until her death in 1909. (Note: According to Larsen (2017), Townsley died c. 1913.)

== Selected works ==
- A Pilgrim Maid: The Self-told Story of Frances E. Townsley, 1908
- The Sabbath Training of the Child for Eternity, 190?
