= John Tenniel =

British illustrator and cartoonist (1820–1914)

Sir John Tenniel
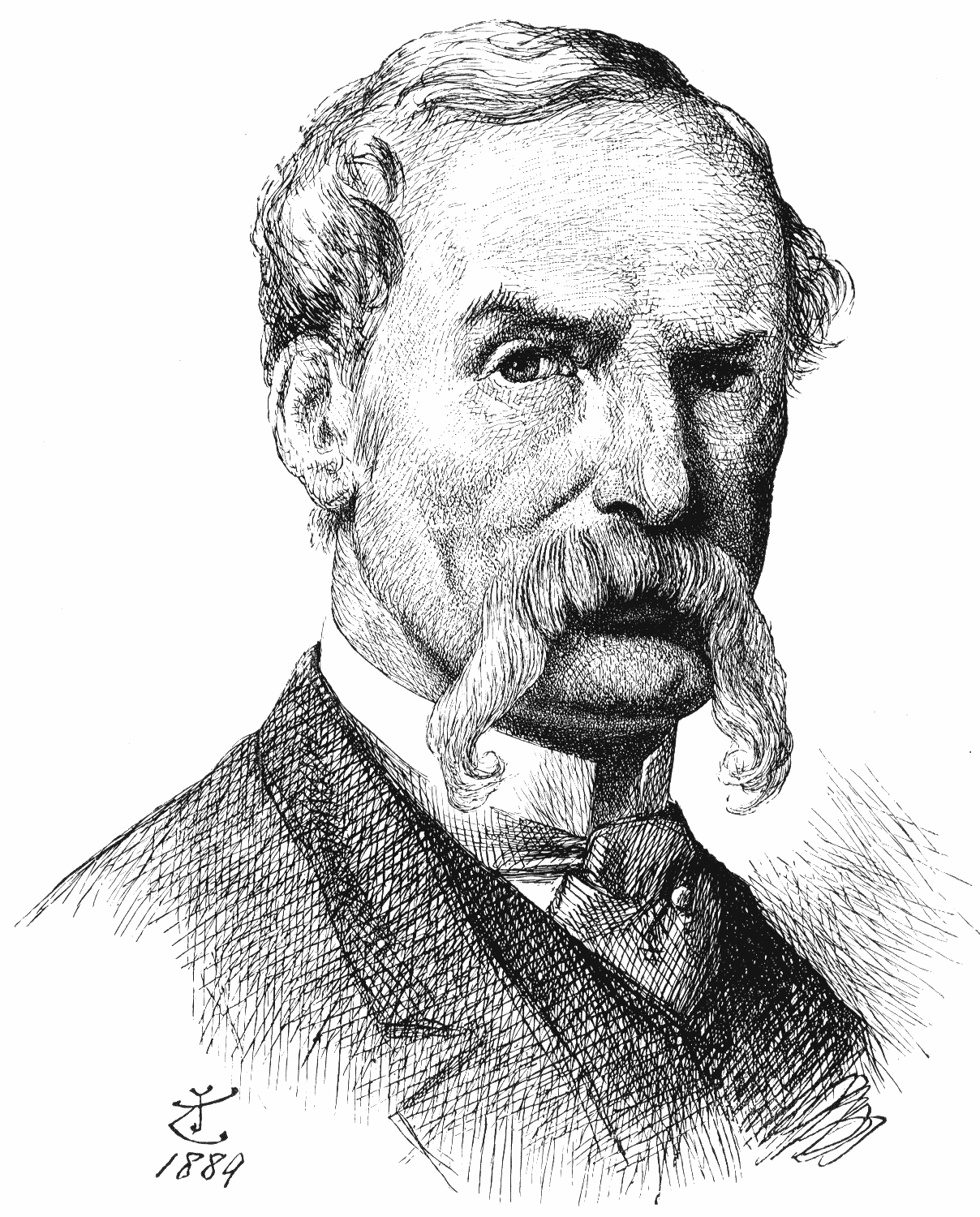
- Self-portrait of John Tenniel, c. 1889
- Born: 28 February 1820; Bayswater, London, England
- Died: 25 February 1914 (aged 93); West Kensington, London, England
- Resting place: Kensal Green Cemetery, London
- Known for: Illustration, children's literature, political cartoons

Sir John Tenniel (/ˈtɛniəl/; 28 February 1820 – 25 February 1914) was an English illustrator, graphic humourist and political cartoonist prominent in the second half of the 19th century. An alumnus of the Royal Academy of Arts in London, he was knighted for artistic achievements in 1893, the first such honour ever bestowed on an illustrator or cartoonist. According to the V&A, "his intelligent, detailed style elevated the fame and standing of cartoonists immeasurably."

Tenniel is remembered mainly as a political cartoonist for Punch magazine for over 50 years (he joined the satirical magazine in 1850 and became its chief cartoonist in 1864) and for his illustrations on the first edition of Lewis Carroll's Alice's Adventures in Wonderland (1865) and Through the Looking-Glass, and What Alice Found There (1871). Tenniel's detailed black-and-white drawings remain the definitive depiction of the Alice characters, with comic book illustrator and writer Bryan Talbot stating, "Carroll never describes the Mad Hatter: our image of him is pure Tenniel."

== Early life ==
Tenniel was born in Bayswater, west London, to John Baptist Tenniel, a fencing and dancing master of Huguenot descent, and Eliza Maria Tenniel. Tenniel had five siblings; two brothers and three sisters. One sister, Mary, was later to marry Thomas Goodwin Green, owner of the pottery that produced Cornishware. Tenniel was a quiet and introverted person, both as a boy and as an adult. He was content to remain firmly out of the limelight and seemed unaffected by competition or change. His biographer Rodney Engen wrote that Tenniel's "life and career was that of the supreme gentlemanly outsider, living on the edge of respectability."

In 1840, Tenniel, while practising fencing, received a serious eye wound from his father's foil, which had accidentally lost its protective tip. Over the years, Tenniel gradually lost sight in his right eye; he never told his father of the severity of the wound, as he did not wish to upset him further.

In spite of a tendency towards high art, Tenniel was already known and appreciated as a humourist. His early companionship with Charles Keene fostered his talent for scholarly caricature.

== Training ==
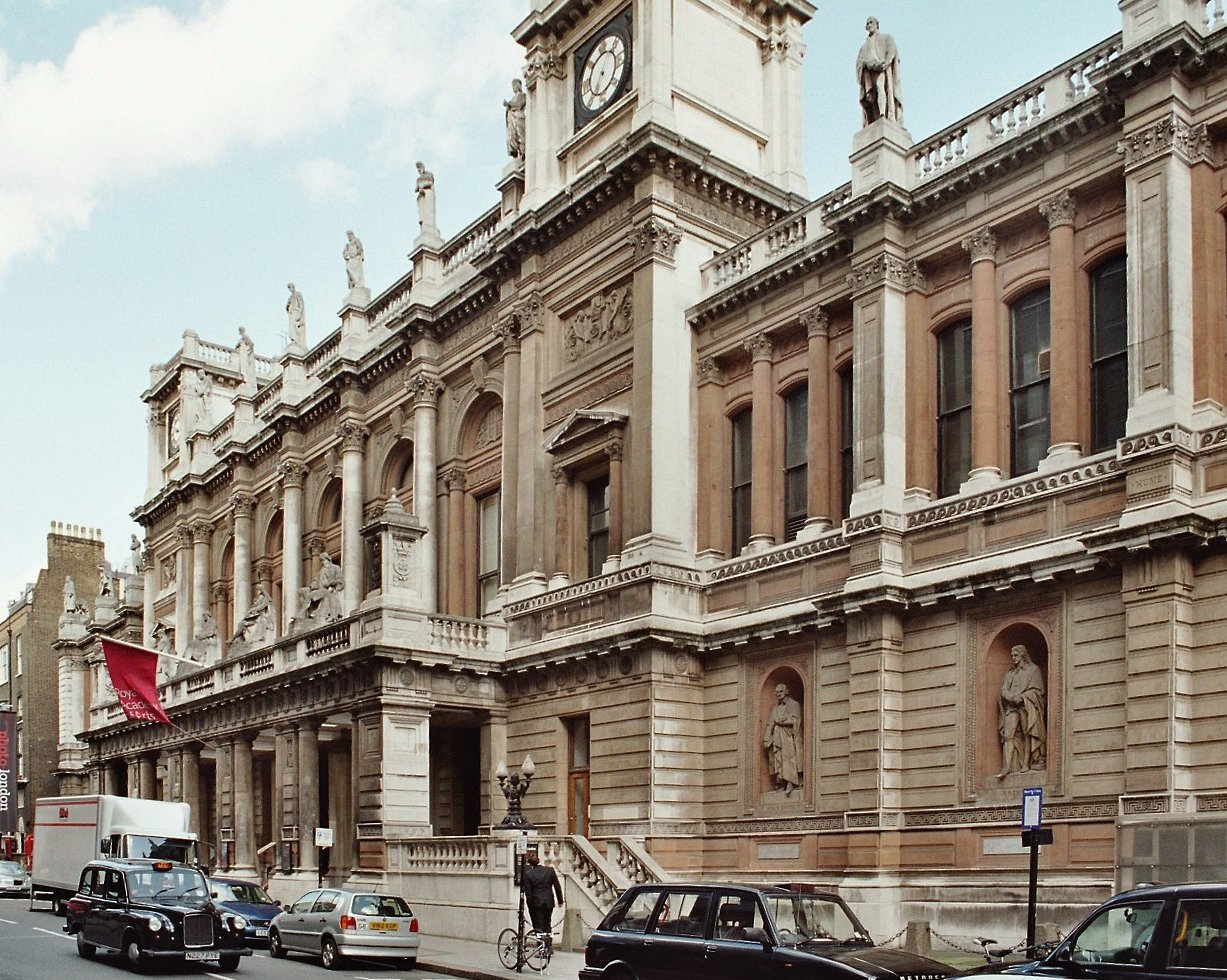
Tenniel was admitted to the Royal Academy of Arts in London in 1842

Tenniel became a student of the Royal Academy of Arts in 1842 by probation; he was admitted because he had made enough copies of classical sculptures to fill the necessary admission portfolio. So it was here that Tenniel returned to his earlier independent education.

While Tenniel's more formal training at the Royal Academy and other institutions was beneficial in nurturing his artistic ambitions, he disagreed with the school's teaching methods, and so he set about educating himself. He studied classical sculptures through painting. However, he was frustrated in this because he lacked instruction in drawing. Tenniel would draw the classical statues at London's Townley Gallery, copy illustrations from books of costumes and armour in the British Museum, and draw animals from the zoo in Regent's Park, as well as actors from London theatres, which he drew from the pits. These studies taught Tenniel to love detail, yet he became impatient in his work and was happiest when he could draw from memory. Though he had a photographic memory, it undermined his early formal training and restricted his artistic ambitions.

Another "formal" means of training was Tenniel's participation in an artists' group, free from the rules of the academy that were stifling him. In the mid-1840s he joined the Artist's Society or Clipstone Street Life Academy, and it could be said that Tenniel first emerged there as a satirical draughtsman.

== Early career ==
Tenniel's first book illustration was for Samuel Carter Hall's The Book of British Ballads, in 1842. While engaged with his first book illustrations, various contests were taking place in London, as a way in which the government could combat the growing Germanic Nazarenes style and promote a truly national English school of art. Tenniel planned to enter the 1845 House of Lords competition amongst artists to win the opportunity to design the mural decoration of the new Palace of Westminster. Despite missing the deadline, he submitted a 16-foot (4.9 m) cartoon, An Allegory of Justice, to a competition for designs for the mural decoration of the new Palace of Westminster. For this he received a £200 premium and a commission to paint a fresco in the Upper Waiting Hall (or Hall of Poets) in the House of Lords.

=== Punch ===
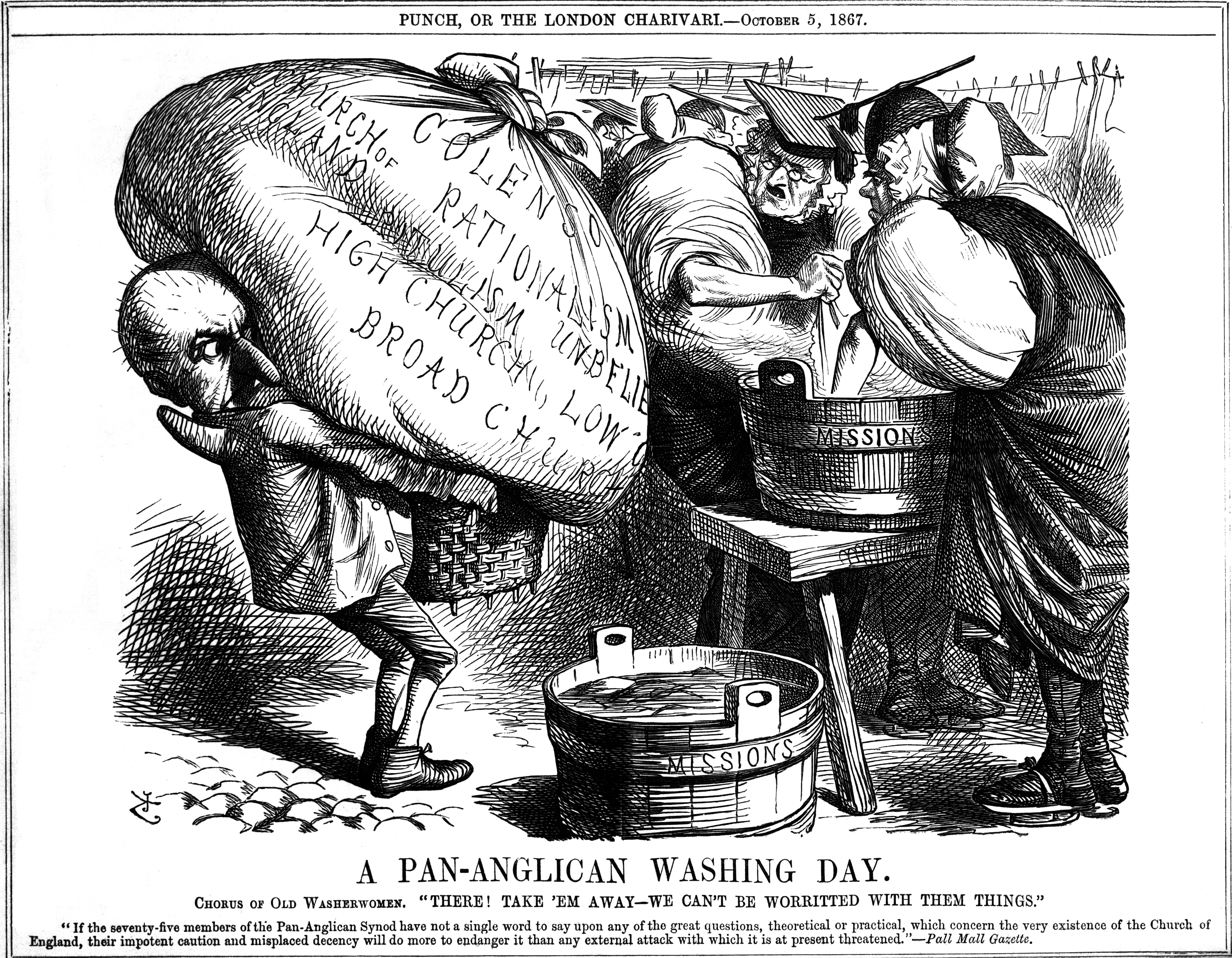
A cartoon by Tenniel on the subject of the 1867 Lambeth Conference

As the influential result of his position as the chief cartoon artist for Punch, Tenniel remained a witness to Britain's sweeping changes. He furthered political and social reform through satirical, often radical, and at times vitriolic images of the world. At Christmas 1850 he was invited by Mark Lemon to fill the position of joint cartoonist (with John Leech) on Punch, having been selected on the strength of recent illustrations to Aesop's Fables. He contributed his first drawing in the initial letter appearing on p. 224, vol. xix. This was entitled "Lord Jack the Giant Killer" and showed Lord John Russell assailing Cardinal Wiseman.

Tenniel's first characteristic lion appeared in 1852, as did his first obituary cartoon. Gradually he took over altogether the weekly drawing of the political "big cut," which Leech was happy to cede to Tenniel in order to restrict himself to his pictures of life and character.

In 1861, Tenniel was offered Leech's position at Punch, as political cartoonist, but Tenniel still maintained a sense of decorum and restraint in the heated social and political issues of the day. When Leech died in 1864, Tenniel continued their work alone, rarely missing a single week.

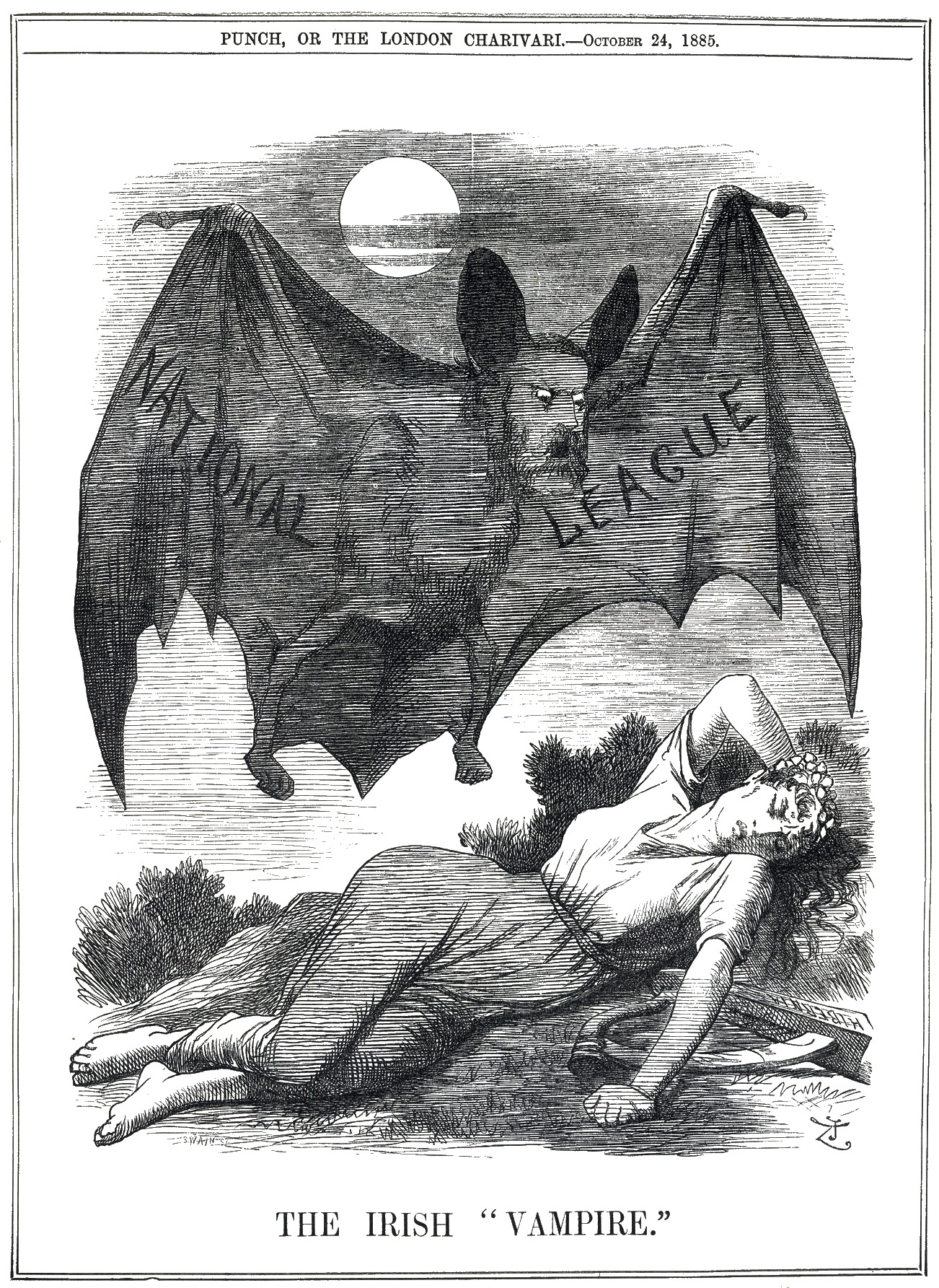
Charles Stewart Parnell depicted as a vampire, menacing maiden Ireland

His task was to follow the wilful choices of his Punch editors, who probably took their cue from The Times and would have felt the suggestions of political tensions from Parliament as well. Tenniel's work could be scathing in effect. The restlessness in the issues of working-class radicalism, labour, war, economy, and other national themes were the targets of Punch, which in turn settled the nature of Tenniel's subjects. His cartoons of the 1860s popularised a portrait of the Irishman as a sub-human being, wanton in his appetites and resembling an orangutan in facial features and posture. Many of Tenniel's political cartoons expressed strong hostility to Irish Nationalism, with Fenians and Land leagues depicted as monstrous, ape-like brutes, while "Hibernia" – the personification of Ireland – was depicted as a beautiful, helpless girl threatened by such "monsters" and turning for protection to an "elder sister" in the shape of a powerful, armoured Britannia.

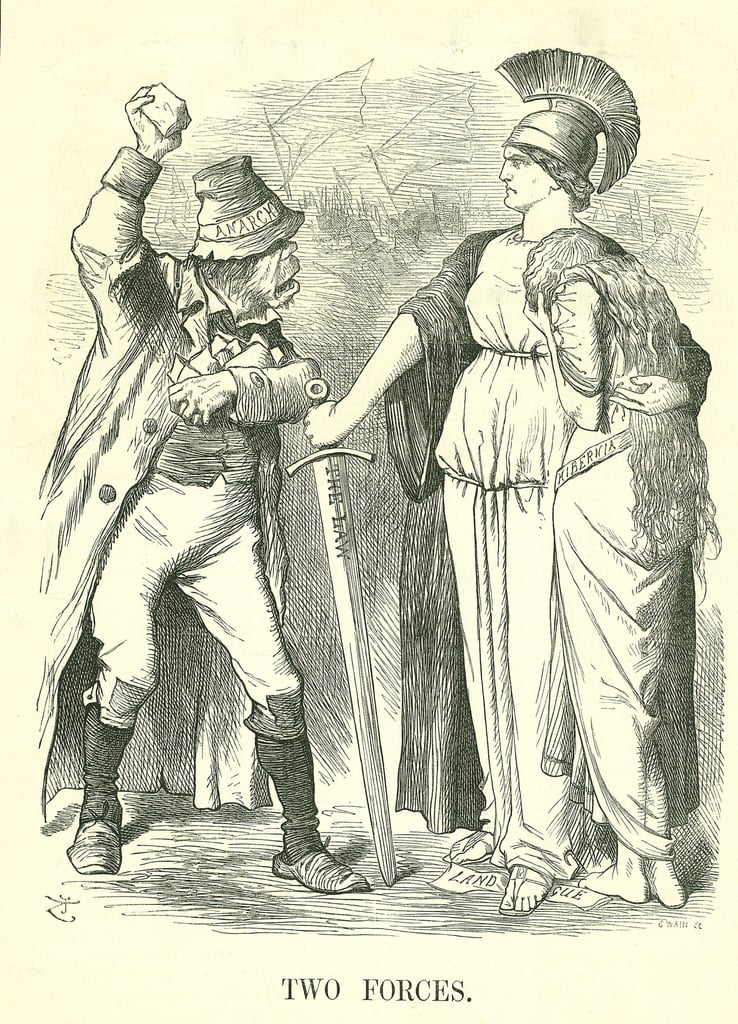
Britannia protecting Hibernia from a simian Land Leaguer

"An Unequal Match", his drawing published in Punch on 8 October 1881, depicted a police officer fighting a criminal with only a baton for protection, trying to put a point across to the public that policing methods needed to be changed.

When examined separately from the book illustrations he did over time, Tenniel's work at Punch alone, expressing decades of editorial viewpoints, often controversial and socially sensitive, was created to echo the voices of the British public. Tenniel drew 2,165 cartoons for Punch, a liberal and politically active publication that mirrored the Victorian public's mood for liberal social changes; thus Tenniel, in his cartoons, represented for years the conscience of the British majority.

Tenniel contributed around 2,300 cartoons, innumerable minor drawings, many double-page cartoons for Punch's Almanac and other specials, and 250 designs for Punch's Pocket-books. By 1866 he could "command ten to fifteen guineas for the reworking of a single Punch cartoon as a pencil sketch," alongside his "comfortable" Punch salary "of about £800 a year".

=== Alice ===
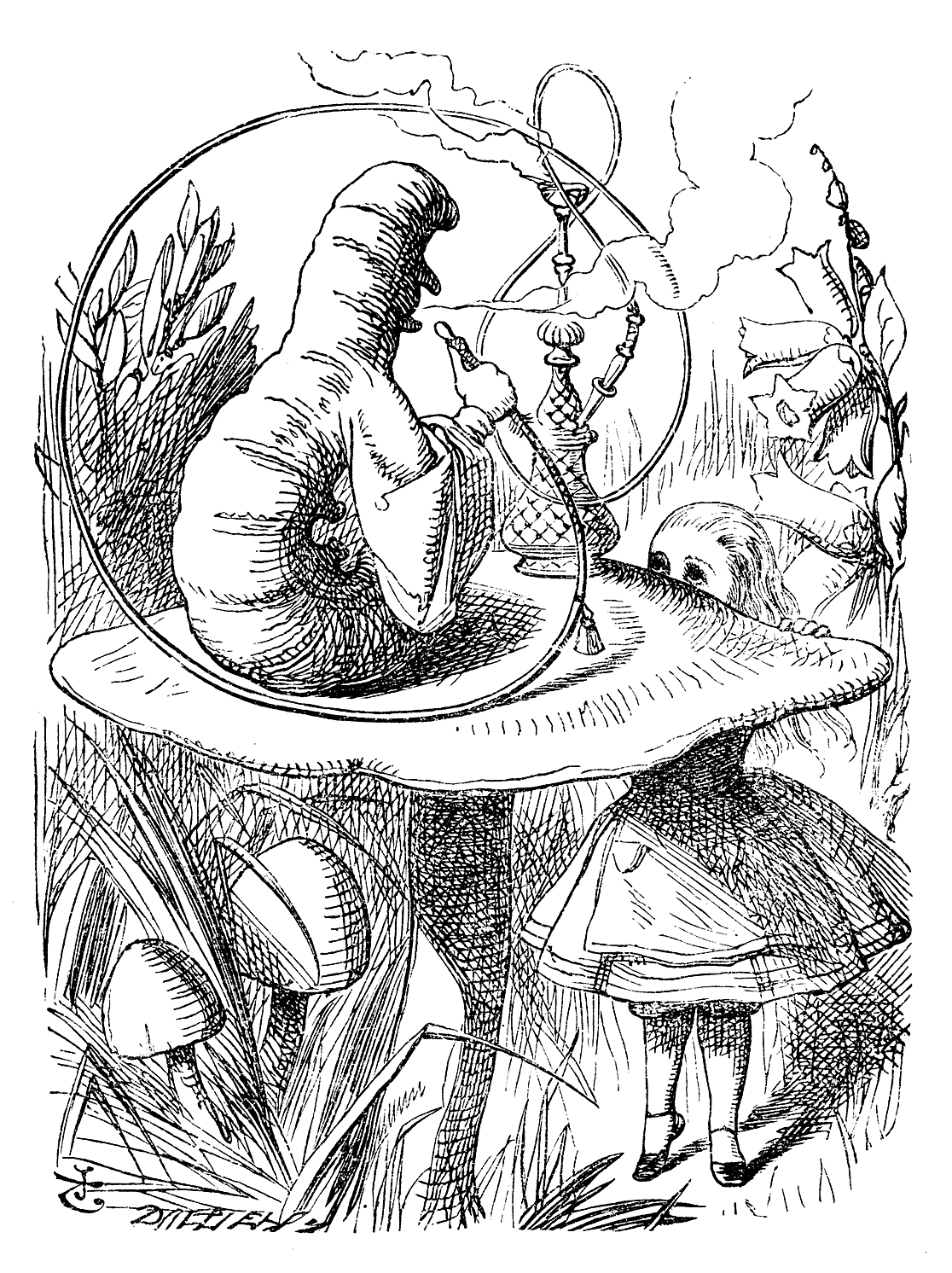
Caterpillar using a hookah. An illustration from Alice's Adventures in Wonderland

Despite the thousands of political cartoons and hundreds of illustrative works attributed to him, much of Tenniel's fame stems from his illustrations for Alice. Tenniel drew 92 drawings for Lewis Carroll's Alice's Adventures in Wonderland (London: Macmillan, 1865) and Through the Looking-Glass and What Alice Found There (London: Macmillan, 1871).

Lewis Carroll originally illustrated Wonderland himself, but his artistic abilities were limited. Engraver Orlando Jewitt, who had worked for Carroll in 1859 and reviewed Carroll's drawings for Wonderland, suggested that he employ a professional. Carroll was a regular reader of Punch and therefore familiar with Tenniel, who in 1865 had long talks with Carroll before illustrating the first edition of Alice's Adventures in Wonderland.

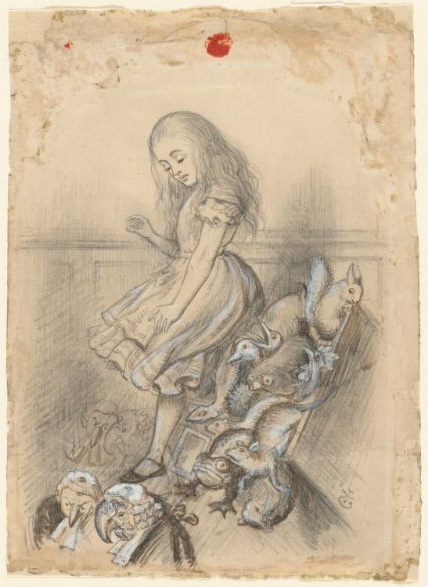
Chapter 12: Alice's evidence. MS Eng 718.6 (12) Tenniel, John, Sir, 1820–1914. Studies for illustrations to Alice's Adventures in Wonderland: drawings, tracings, c. 1864 from Houghton Library, Harvard University

The first print run of 2,000 was sold in the United States, rather than England, because Tenniel objected to the print quality. A new edition was released in December 1865, carrying an 1866 date, and became an instant best-seller, increasing Tenniel's fame. His drawings for both books have become some of the most famous literary illustrations. After 1872, when the Carroll projects were finished, Tenniel largely abandoned literary illustration. Carroll did later approach Tenniel to undertake another project for him. To this Tenniel replied:

It is a curious fact that with Looking-Glass the faculty of making drawings for book illustrations departed from me, and... I have done nothing in that direction since.

Tenniel's Alice illustrations were engraved onto blocks of deal wood by the Brothers Dalziel. These then served as masters for the electrotype copies for the actual printing of the books. The original wood blocks are held by the Bodleian Library in Oxford. They are not usually on public display, but were exhibited in 2003.

The bronze Alice in Wonderland sculpture (1959) in Central Park in Manhattan, New York City, is patterned on his illustrations.

== Style ==
=== Influence of German Nazarenes ===
The style associated with the Nazarene movement of the 19th century influenced many later artists, including Tenniel. It can be characterised as "shaded outlines", where the lines on the side of figures or objects are given extra thickness or drawn double to suggest shading or volume. Furthermore, this style is extremely precise, with the artist making a hard clear outline for its figures, dignifying them and the compositions, while giving restraint in expression and paleness of tone. Though Tenniel's early illustrations in the Nazarene style were not well received, his encounter with the style pointed him in a good direction.

=== Eye for detail ===
After the 1850s, Tenniel's style was modernised to incorporate more detail in backgrounds and in figures. The inclusion of background details corrected the previously weak Germanic staging of his illustrations. Tenniel's more precisely-designed illustrations depicted specific moments of time, locale and individual character instead of just generalised scenes.

In addition to a change in specificity of background, Tenniel developed a new interest in human types, expressions, and individualised representation, something that would carry over into his illustrations of Wonderland. Referred to by many as theatricality, this hallmark of Tenniel's style probably stemmed from his earlier interest in caricature. In Tenniel's first years on Punch he developed this caricaturist's interest in the uniqueness of persons and things, almost giving a human like personality to the objects in the environment. For example, a comparison of one of John Everett Millais's illustrations of a girl in a chair with Tenniel's illustration of Alice in a chair shows clearly that Millais's chair is just a prop, whereas Tenniel's chair possesses a menacing and towering presence.

Another change in style was his shaded lines. These transformed from mechanical horizontal lines to vigorously hand-drawn hatching that greatly intensified darker areas.

=== Grotesque ===
Tenniel's "grotesque" was one reason why Lewis Carroll wanted Tenniel as his illustrator for the Alice books, in the sense of imparting a disturbing sense that the real world may have ceased to be reliable. Tenniel's style was characteristically grotesque through his dark, atmospheric compositions of exaggerated fantasy creatures carefully drawn in outline. Often the mechanism was to use animal heads on recognisable human bodies or vice versa, as Grandville had done in the Parisian satirical journal Charivari. In Tenniel's illustrations, the grotesque is found also in mergers of beings and things, deformities in and violence to the human body (e. g. when Alice drinks the potion and grows huge), and a proclivity to deal with ordinary things of this world while presenting such phenomena. The most noticeably grotesque is Tenniel's famous Jabberwock drawing in Alice.

The Alice illustrations combine fantasy and reality. Scholars such as Morris trace Tenniel's stylistic change to the late 1850s trend towards realism. For the grotesque to operate, "it is our world which has to be transformed and not some fantasy realm." The illustrations constantly but subtly remind us of the real world, as do some of Tenniel's scenes derived from a medieval town, the portico of a Georgian town, or the checked jacket on the White Rabbit. Additionally, Tenniel closely follows Carroll's text, so that the reader sees the similitude between the written text and the illustrations. These touches of realism help to convince readers that all these seemingly grotesque inhabitants of Wonderland are simply themselves, simply real, not just performing.

== Image and text in Alice ==
One unusual aspect of the Alice books is the placing of Tenniel's illustrations on the pages. This physical relation of illustrations to text meshes them together. Carroll and Tenniel expressed this in various ways. One was bracketing: two relevant sentences would bracket an image as a way of imparting the moment that Tenniel was trying to illustrate. This bracketing of Tenniel's pictures with text adds to their "dramatic immediacy." However, other, less frequent illustrations work with the texts as captions.

Another link between illustration and text is the use of broader and narrower illustrations. Broader ones are meant to be centred on the page, narrower to be "let in" or run flush to the margin, alongside a narrow column of continuing text. Still, words run in parallel with the depiction of those things. For example, when Alice says, "Oh, my poor little feet!", it not only occurs at the foot of the page but is right next to her feet in the illustration. Some of these narrower illustrations are L-shaped, and of great importance as some of his most memorable work. The top or base of these illustrations runs the full width of the page, but the other end leaves room on one side for text.

== Book illustrations ==
A selective list:

Entirely by Tenniel

- Juvenile Verse and Picture Book (1846)
- Undine (1846)
- Aesop's Fables (1848)
- Blair's Grave (1858)
- Shirley Brooks' The Gordian Knot (1860)
- Shirley Brooks' The Silver Cord (1861)
- Moore's Lalla Rookh (1861), 69 drawings
- Lewis Carroll's Alice's Adventures in Wonderland (1866)
- The Mirage of Life (1867)
- Lewis Carroll's Through the Looking-Glass (1870)
- Lewis Carroll's The Nursery "Alice" (1890)

Tenniel's collaborations

- Thomas Ingoldsby's The Ingoldsby Legends
- Pollok's Course of Time (1857)
- The Poets of the Nineteenth Century (1858)
- Edgar Allan Poe's "The Raven", in The Poetical Works of Edgar Allan Poe (1858)
- Home Affections (1858)
- Cholmondeley Pennell's Puck on Pegasus (1863)
- The Arabian Nights (1863)
- L. B. White, English Sacred Poetry of the Olden Time (1864)
- Legends and Lyrics (1865)
- Martin Farquhar Tupper's Proverbial Philosophy
- Barry Cornwall's Dramatic Scenes: With other poems (1857)

== Retirement and death ==
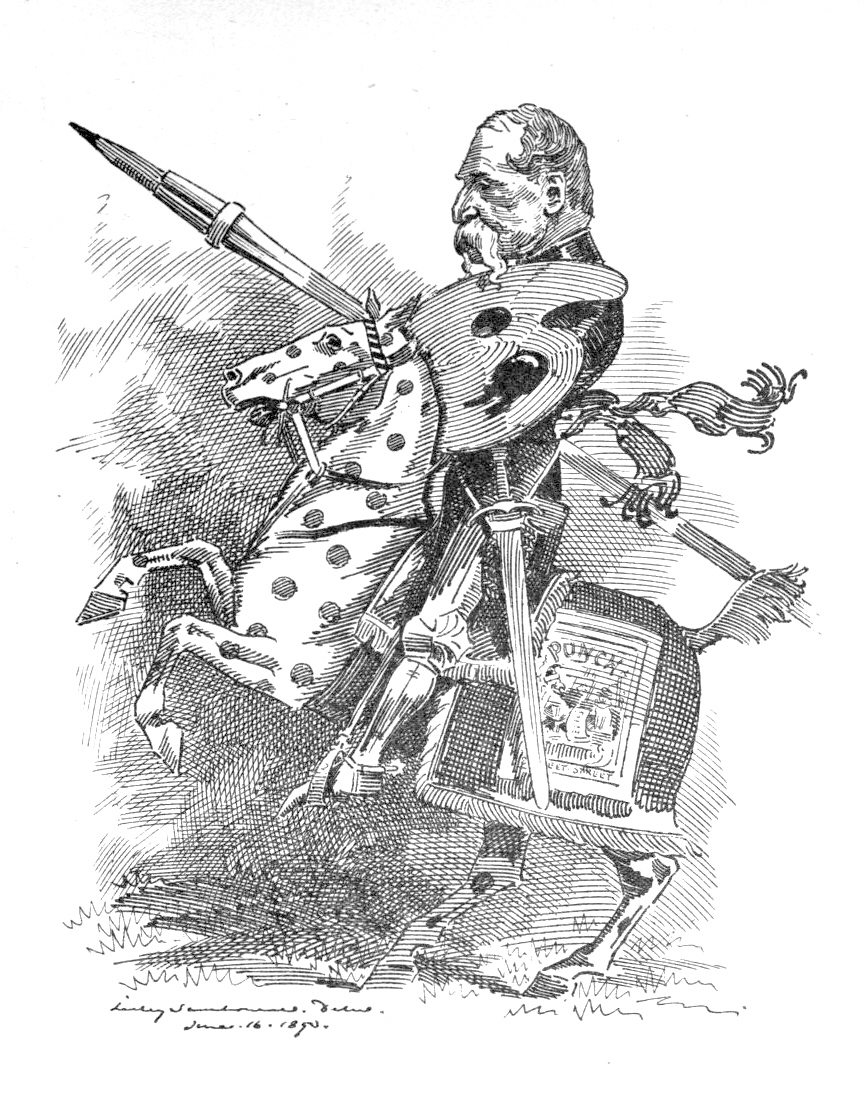
The Black-and-White Knight, by Linley Sambourne, Punch, 24 June 1893, a tribute to Tenniel

An ultimate tribute came to an elderly Tenniel as he was knighted for public service in 1893 by Queen Victoria. It was the first such honour ever bestowed on an illustrator or cartoonist. His fellows saw his knighthood as gratitude for "raising what had been a fairly lowly profession to an unprecedented level of respectability." With his knighthood, Tenniel elevated the social status of the black-and-white illustrator, and sparked a new sense of recognition of his profession. When he retired in January 1901, Tenniel was honoured with a farewell banquet (on 12 June) that was attended by figures across politics, law, literature, science, society and art, including authors Bram Stoker and Sir Arthur Conan Doyle, and was presided by Arthur Balfour, then Leader of the House of Commons, who described Tenniel as "a great artist and a great gentleman".

Tenniel died of natural causes at his home in West Kensington, London, on 25 February 1914, three days before his 94th birthday. His funeral was held on 2 March 1914 and he was buried in Kensal Green Cemetery, London.

== Legacy ==
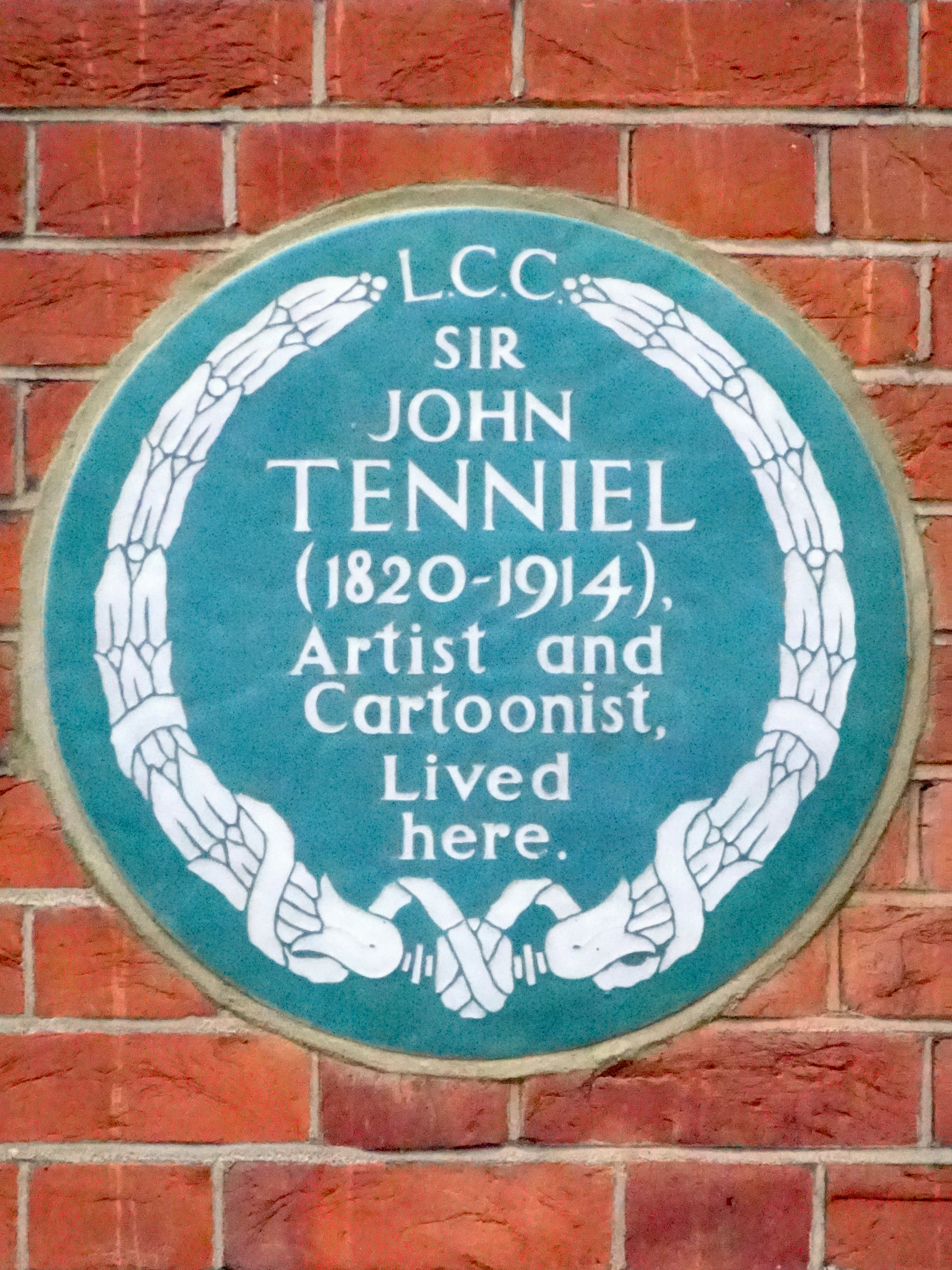
Commemorative plaque on Tenniel's house in West Kensington

The Punch historian M. H. Spielmann, who knew Tenniel, wrote that the political clout contained in his Punch cartoons was capable of "swaying parties and people, too". Two days after his death, The Daily Graphic recalled how Tenniel "had an influence on the political feeling of this time which is hardly measurable ... . While Tenniel was drawing them [his subjects], we always looked to the Punch cartoon to crystallize the national and international situation, and the popular feeling about it—and never looked in vain." This social influence resulted from the weekly publishing of his political cartoons over 50 years, whereby Tenniel's fame allowed for a want and need for his particular illustrative work, away from the newspaper. Tenniel became not only one of Victorian Britain's most published illustrators, but as a Punch cartoonist one of the "supreme social observers" of British society and an integral component of a powerful journalistic force. The New-York Tribune journalist George W. Smalley referred to Tenniel in 1914 as "one of the greatest intellectual forces of his time, [who] understood social laws and political energies."

Public exhibitions of Tenniel's work were held in 1895 and 1900. He was also the author of one of the mosaics, Leonardo da Vinci, in the South Court in the Victoria and Albert Museum. His stippled watercolour drawings appeared from time to time in the exhibitions of the Royal Institute of Painters in Water Colours, to which he had been elected in 1874.

Tenniel Close, a Bayswater street near his former studio, is named after him. In 2025 a commemorative plaque was installed on the exterior of his house in West Kensington. The plaque, which had been commissioned in 1930 by London County Council was originally placed on his house in Maida Vale, but was removed when that building was demolished in the 1950s. After 65 years in storage, the plaque was restored and rehung by English Heritage.

== Gallery ==
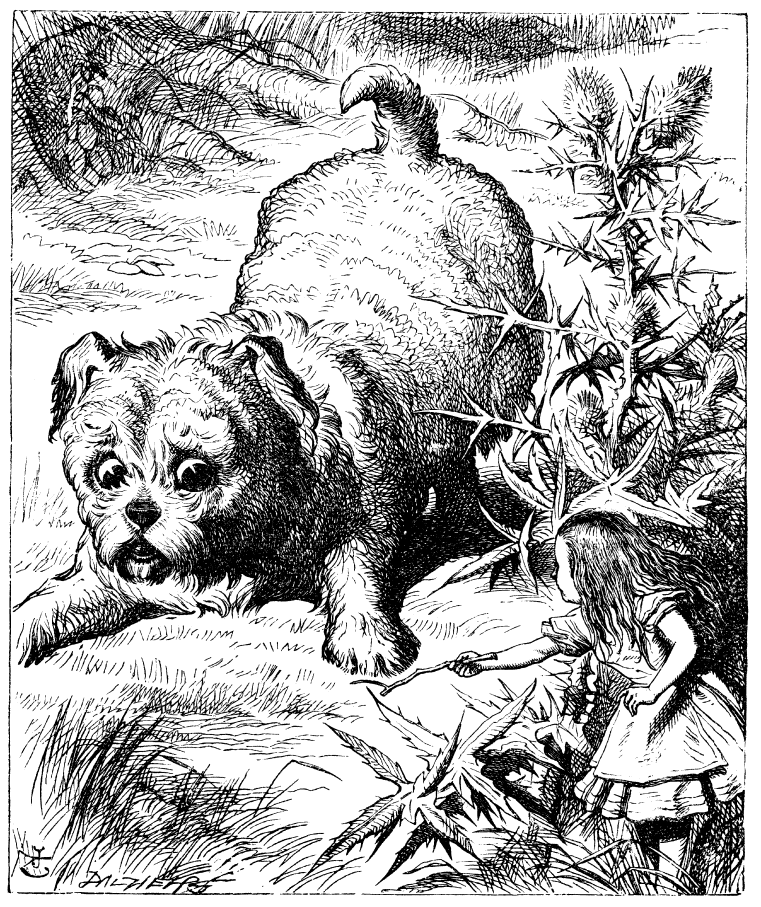
Alice playing with the puppy, Alice in Wonderland 1865

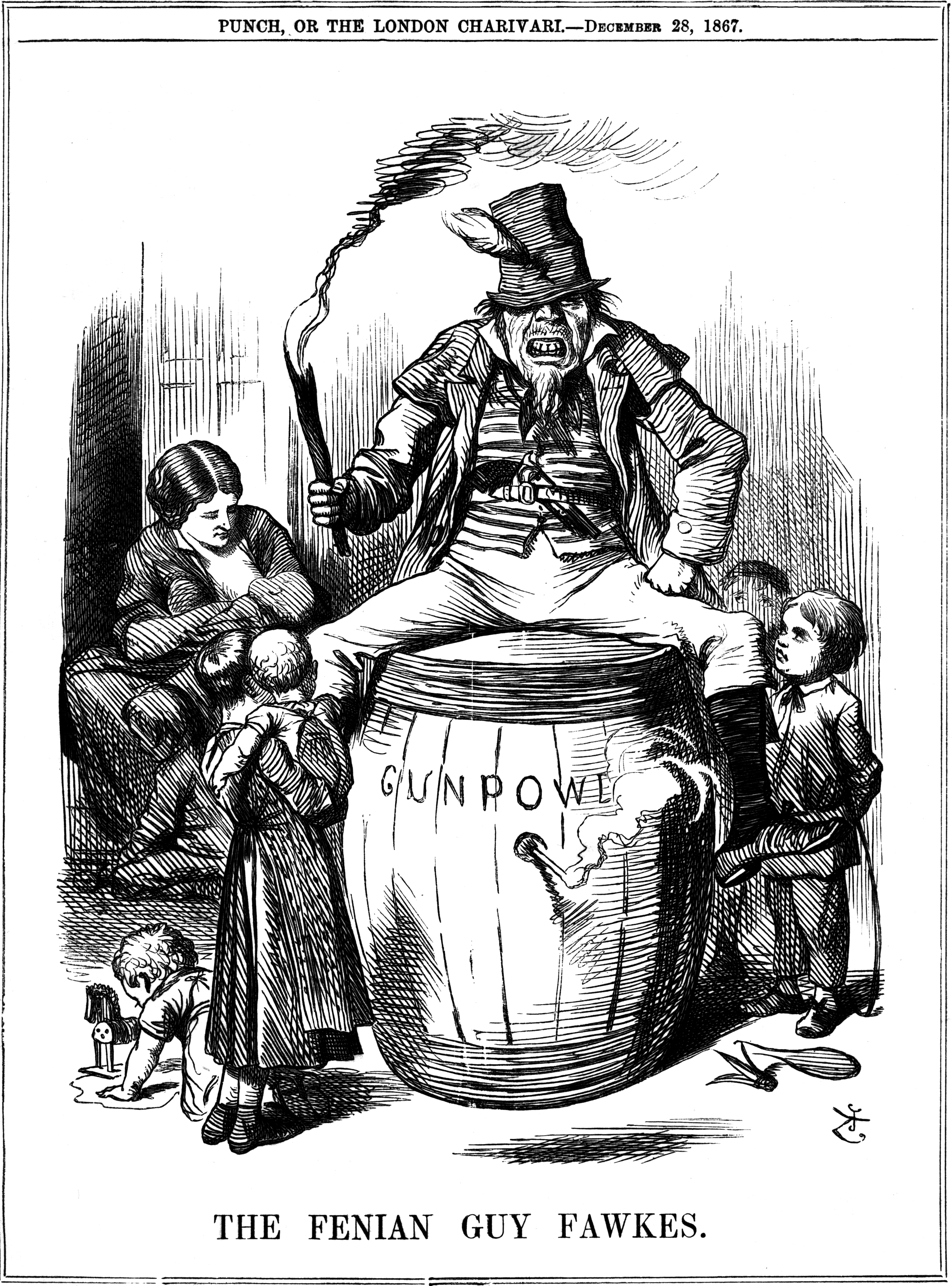
The Fenian Guy Fawkes 1867, Punch cartoon referring to the Clerkenwell explosion

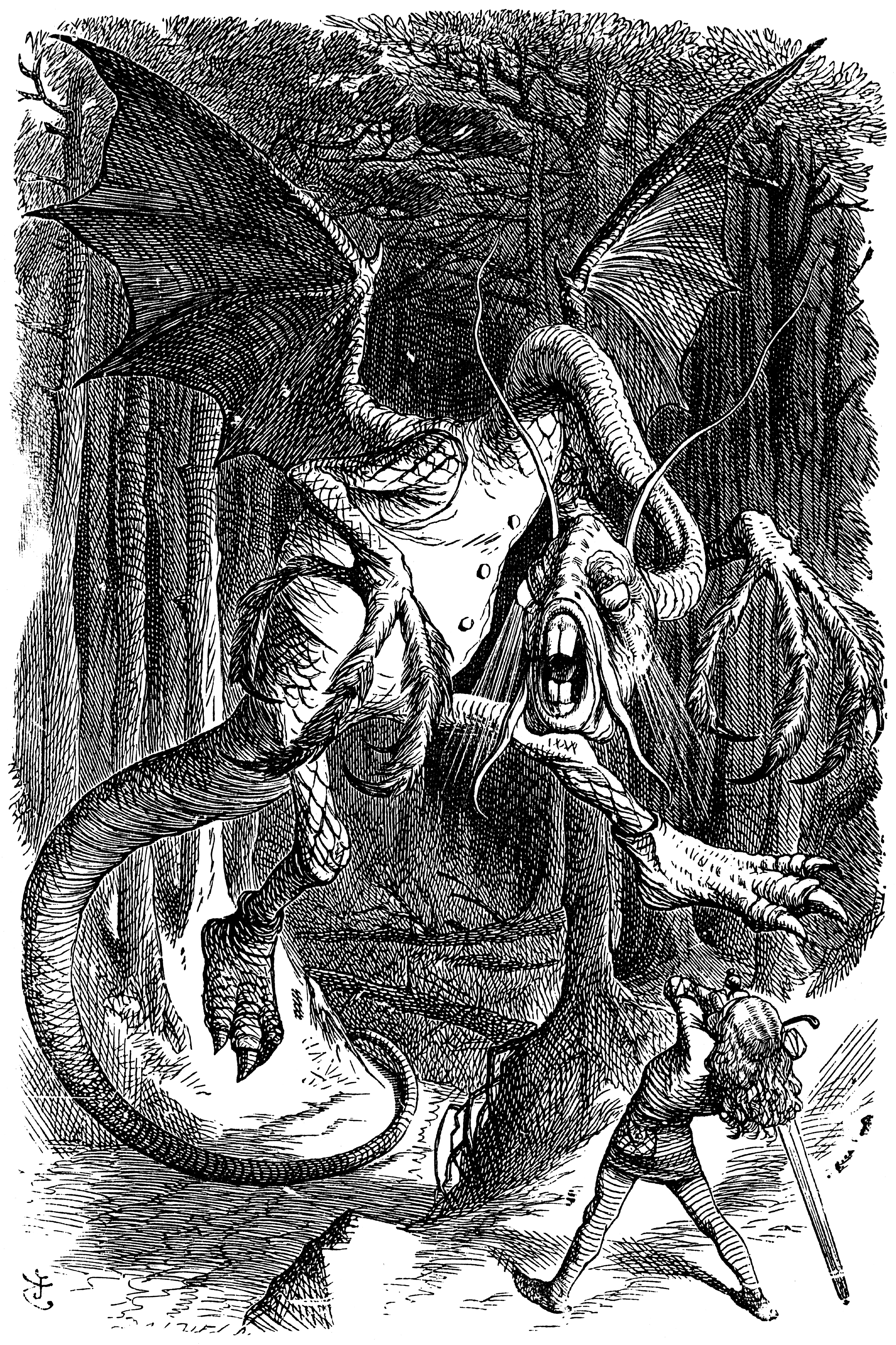
The Jabberwock from the poem "Jabberwocky", in Through the Looking-Glass 1871

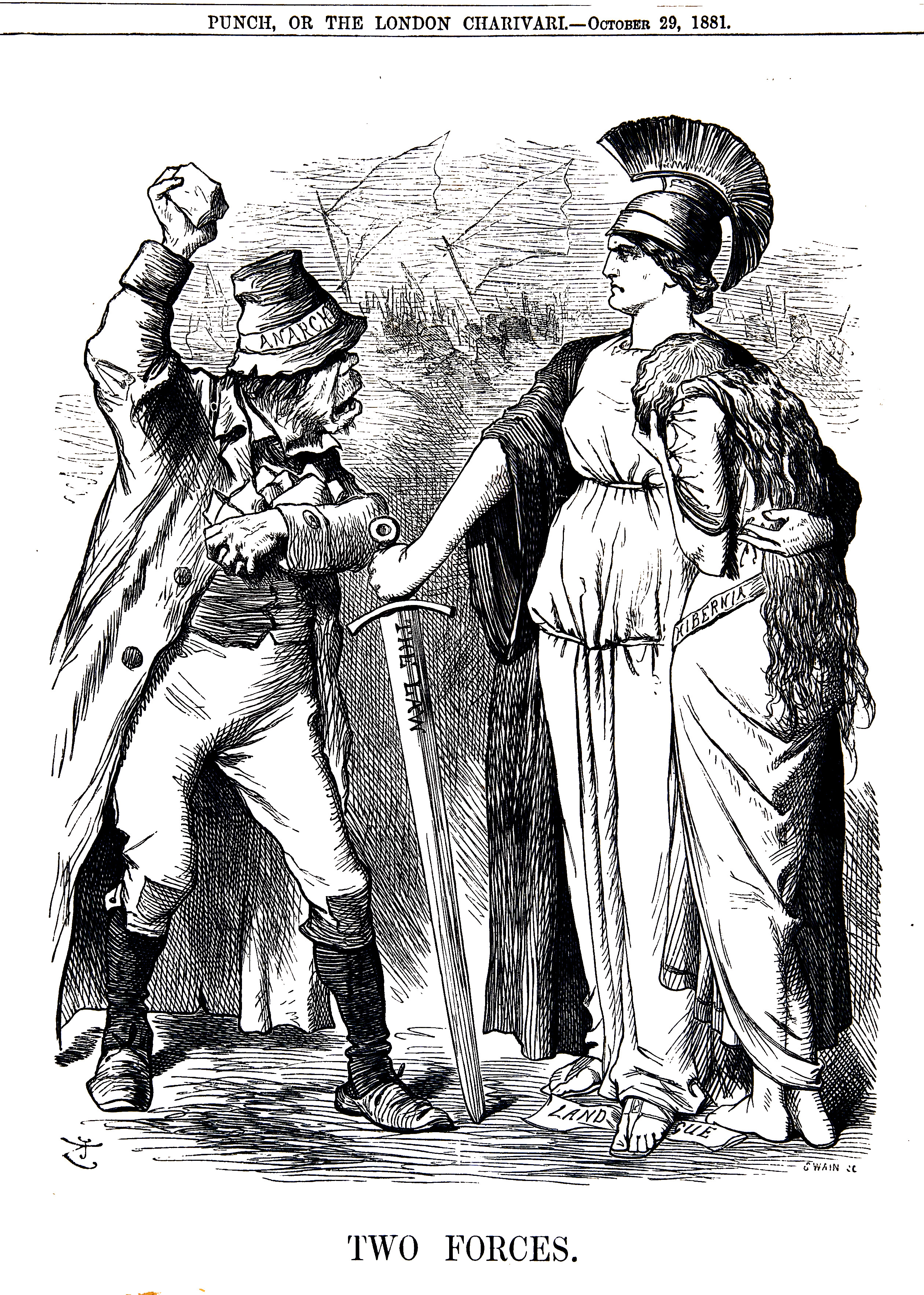
Two Forces, 1881 Punch cartoon opposing the Irish National Land League

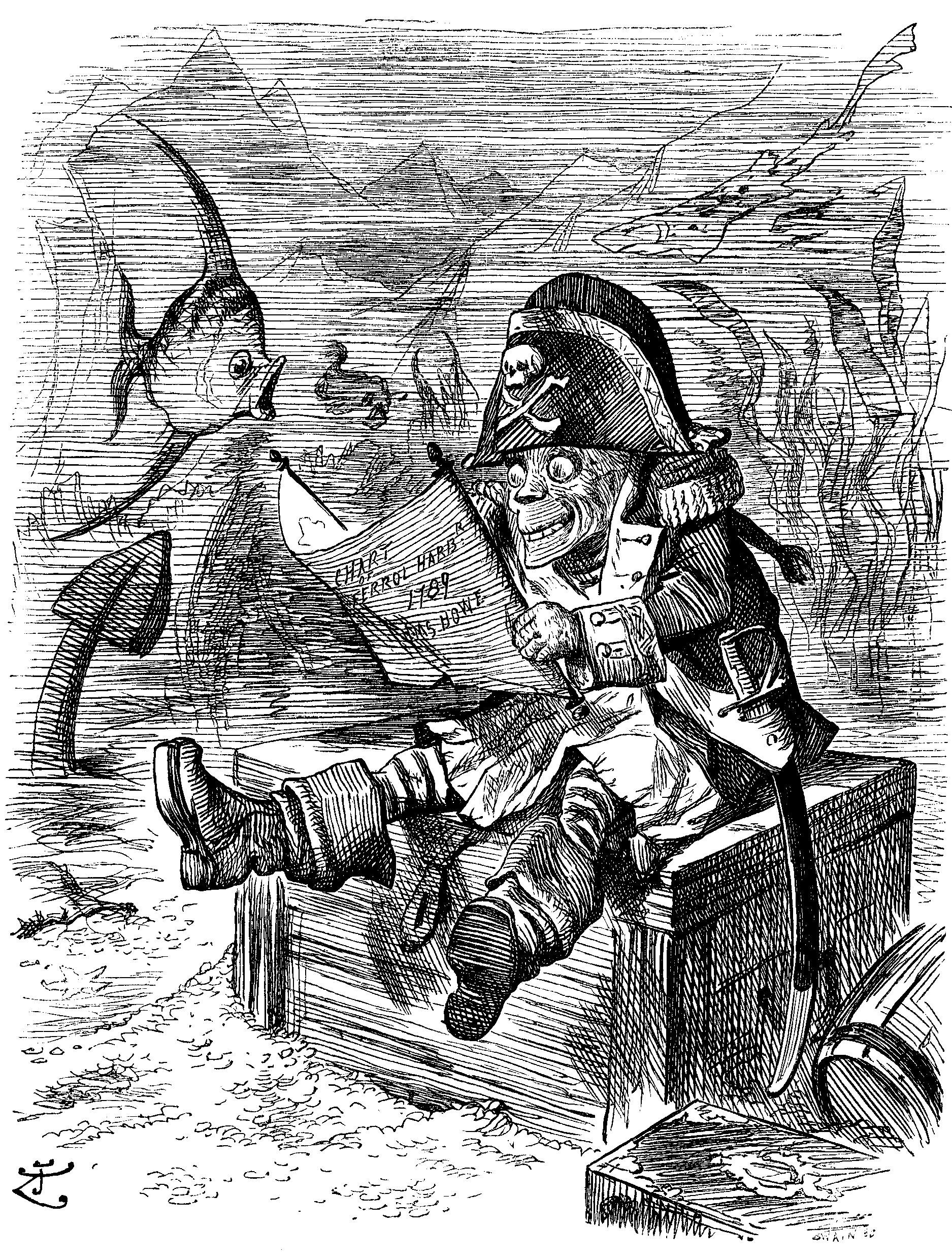
Davy Jones's locker, 1892 Punch cartoon

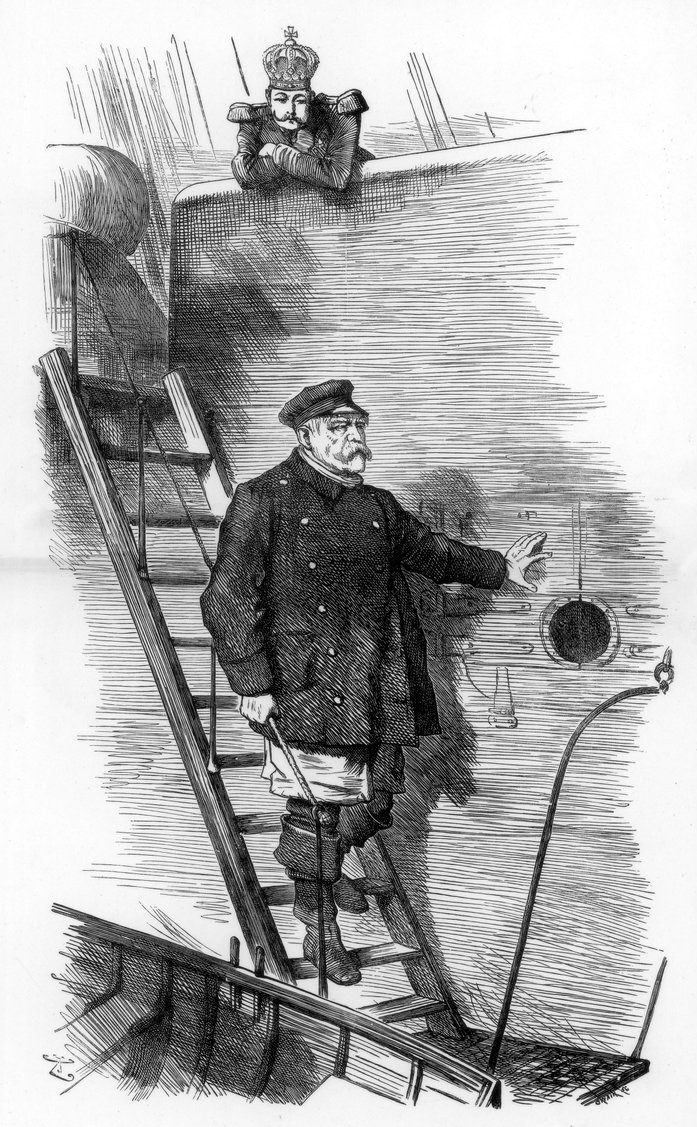
Dropping the Pilot, 1890 Punch cartoon commenting on Otto von Bismarck's dismissal

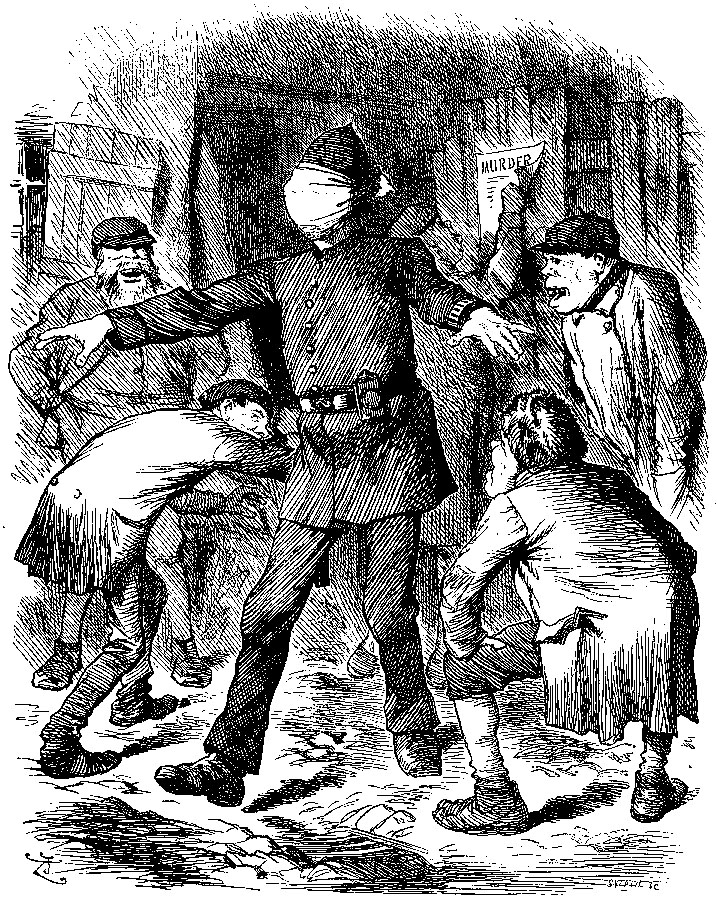
Blind Man's Buff, 1888 Punch cartoon commenting on the police's alleged incompetence in catching Jack the Ripper

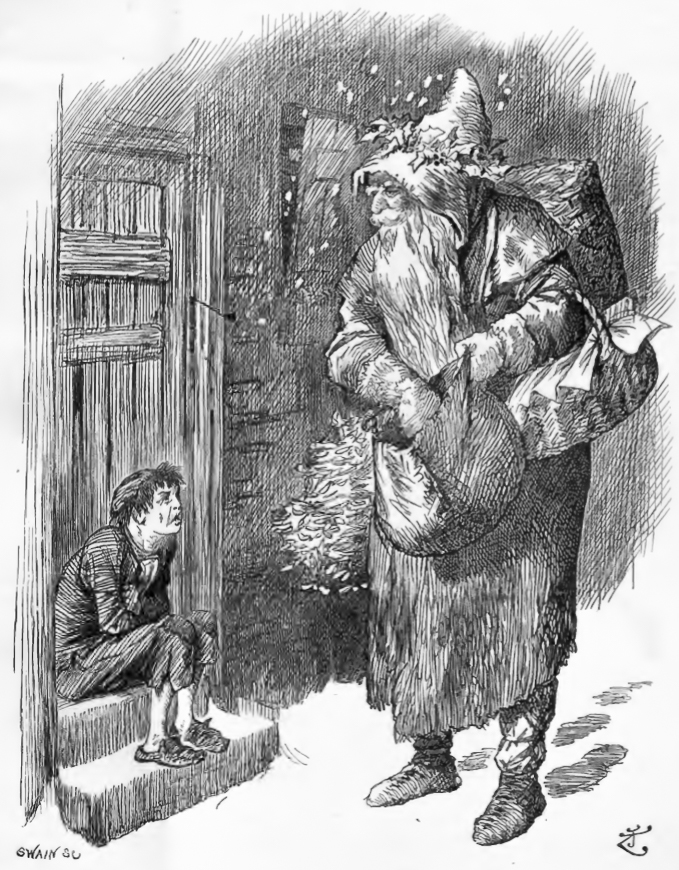
A Christmas Puzzle, (Father Christmas: "Now, my little man, where's your stocking?") Punch, 1895

== Bibliography ==
- John Buchanan-Brown, Early Victorian Illustrated Books: Britain, France and Germany. London: The British Library and Oak Knoll Press, 2005
- Lewis Carroll, Alice's Adventures in Wonderland & Through the Looking-Glass. Edited by Roger Lancelyn Green. Illustrated by John Tenniel. Oxford: Oxford UP, 1971
- Lewis Carroll, The Annotated Alice: Alice's Adventures in Wonderland & Through the Looking-Glass. Introduction and notes by Martin Gardner. Illustrated by John Tenniel. New York: Bramhall House, 1960
- Morton N. Cohen and Edward Wakeling, eds, Lewis Carroll and His Illustrators: Collaborations and Correspondence, 1865–1898. Ithaca: Cornell UP, 2003
- L. Perry Curtis, book review: Sir John Tenniel: Aspects of His Work. Victorian Studies. Vol. 40, Bloomington: Indiana UP, 1996. 168–171. JSTOR recovered 21 November 2010
- L. Perry Curtis, book review: Drawing Conclusions: A Cartoon History of Anglo-Irish Relations, 1798–1998 by Roy Douglas, et al. Victorian Studies. Bloomington: Indiana UP, 2001. 520–522. JSTOR recovered 21 November 2010
- Edward D. Dalziel and George Dalziel, The Brothers Dalziel: A Record of Fifty Years' Work, London: Methuen, 1901
- Engen, Rodney (1991). Sir John Tenniel: Alice's white knight. Aldershot, Hants, England Brookfield, Vt., USA: Scolar Press Gower Pub. Co. ISBN 978-0-85967-872-8. OCLC 23220287.
- Eleanor M. Garvey and W. H. Bond, Introduction, Tenniel's Alice. Cambridge: Harvard College Library/The Stinehour Press, 1978
- J. Francis Gladstone and Jo Elwyn-Jones, The Alice Companion Palgrave Macmillan, 1998. ISBN 9780333673492
- Paul Goldman, Victorian Illustrators, Aldershot, UK: Scolar Press, 1996
- Hancher, Michael (1985). The Tenniel illustrations to the Alice Books. Columbus: Ohio State University Press. ISBN 978-0-8142-0408-5. OCLC 10800589. Archived from the original on 1 April 2016.
- Marguerite Mespoulet, Creators of Wonderland. New York: Arrow Editions, 1934
- Harry Levin, "Wonderland Revisited" The Kenyon Review, Vol. 27, no. 4, Kenyon College, 1965, pp. 591–616 JSTOR recovered 3 December 2010
- Morris, Frankie (2005). Artist of Wonderland: the life, political cartoons, and illustrations of Tenniel. Charlottesville: University of Virginia Press. ISBN 978-0-8139-2343-7. OCLC 57342183.
- Frankie Morris, John Tenniel, Cartoonist: A Critical and Sociocultural Study in the Art of the Victorian Political Cartoon, PhD dissertation, Columbia: University of Missouri, 1985
- William Cosmo Monkhouse, The Life and Works of Sir John Tenniel, London: ArtJournal Easter Annual, 1901
- Graham Ovenden and John Davis, The Illustrators of Alice in Wonderland and Through the Looking-Glass, New York: St Martin's Press, 1972
- Forrest Reid, Illustrators of the Eighteen Sixties: An Illustrated Survey of the Work of 58 British Artists, New York: Dover Publications, 1975
- Frances Sarzano, Sir John Tenniel, London: Pellegrini & Cudahy, 1948
- Richard Scully, Eminent Victorian Cartoonists, Volume I: The Founders, London: Political Cartoon Society, 2018
- Simpson, Roger (1994). Sir John Tenniel: aspects of his work. Rutherford N.J. London: Fairleigh Dickinson University Press Associated University Presses. ISBN 978-0-8386-3493-6. OCLC 27264623.
- William Thomas Stead, ed., The Review of Reviews, Vol. 23, p. 406, London: Horace Marshall & Son, 1901
- M. H. Spielmann, The History of Punch, London: Cassell, 1895
- G. P. Stoker, Sir John Tenniel A study of his development as an artist, with particular reference to the Book Illustrations and Political Cartoons, U of London PhD thesis, 1994
- Jan Susina, The Place of Lewis Carroll in Children's Literature. New York: Routledge, 2010
- Jan Susina, book review: "Artist of Wonderland: The Life, Political Cartoons and Illustrations of Tenniel", Children's Literature Association Quarterly, Vol. 31, no. 2, pp. 202–205, The Johns Hopkins UP, 2006
- Wakeling, Edward (2014). Lewis Carroll: the man and his circle. London: I.B. Tauris. ISBN 978-1-78076-820-5. OCLC 898028481.
