= Gov. Samuel J. Tilden Monument =

- U.S. National Register of Historic Places
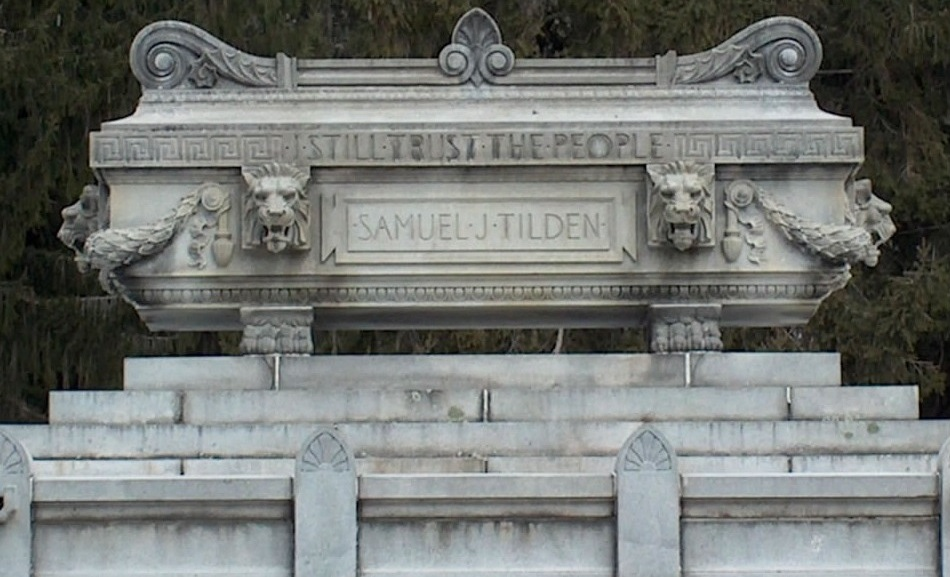
- Governor Samuel J. Tilden Memorial, New Lebanon, New York.

- Location within New York Location within the United States
- Nearest city: New Lebanon, New York
- Coordinates: 42°28′30″N 73°23′9″W
- Area: less than one acre
- Built: 1895-1896
- Architect: Ernest Flagg; Carl Conrads, sculptor
- Architectural style: Classical Revival
- NRHP reference No.: 06000573
- Added to NRHP: July 14, 2006

Gov. Samuel J. Tilden Monument is a historic funeral monument located in Cemetery of the Evergreens at New Lebanon in Columbia County, New York. It was designed by architect Ernest Flagg (1856–1947) and built in 1895–1896. It contains the remains of New York State Governor Samuel J. Tilden (1814–1886). It consists of a nine and one half ton cut granite sarcophagus on a raised platform of four cut granite steps. The crypt entrance is marked by a cast-bronze gate that provides access to three brick arched crypts.

It was added to the National Register of Historic Places in 2006.
