= 1859 New York City Corporation Counsel election =

- December 6, 1859
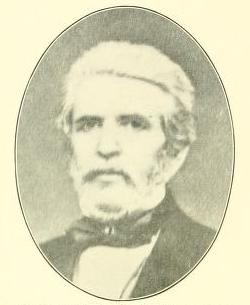

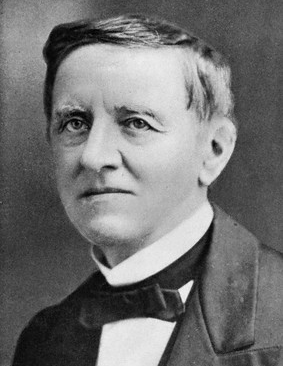

| Nominee | Greene C. Bronson | Samuel J. Tilden | Solomon L. Hull |
| Party | Independent Democratic | Democratic | Republican |
| Alliance | Mozart Hall | Tammany Hall |
| Popular vote | 32,202 | 23,979 | 21,651 |
| Percentage | 41.37% | 30.81% | 27.82% |
- Ward results Bronson: 30–40% 40–50% 50–60% 60–70% Tilden: 50–60% Hull: 30–40% 40–50%
Corporation Counsel before election
Richard Busteed
Democratic
Elected Corporation Counsel
Greene C. Bronson
Democratic

An election for Corporation Counsel of New York City was held on December 6, 1859. Incumbent Corporation Counsel Richard Busteed chose to not run for re-election.

Former New York Court of Appeals Judge Greene C. Bronson beat former Corporation Counsel and future 1876 presidential nominee Samuel J. Tilden. After the election, Tilden announced that he was "out of politics."

== General election ==
=== Candidates ===
- Democratic: Greene C. Bronson, former Judge of the New York Court of Appeals and Collector of the Port of New York.
- Democratic: Samuel J. Tilden, former Corporation Counsel (1843–1844) and former member of the New York State Assembly (1846-1847).
- Republican: Solomon L. Hull, attorney.

=== Results ===
1859 New York City Corporation Counsel election
| Party | Candidate | Votes | % |
|---|---|---|---|
| Independent Democratic | Greene C. Bronson | 32,202 | 41.37% |
| Democratic | Samuel J. Tilden | 23,979 | 30.81% |
| Republican | Solomon L. Hull | 21,651 | 27.82% |
| Total votes | | 77,832 | 100.00% |

=== Results by ward ===
Results by wards
| Ward | Bronson Mozart | | Tilden Tammany | | Hull Republican | | Total |
| Ward | Votes | % | Votes | % | Votes | % | Total |
|---|---|---|---|---|---|---|---|
| 1 | 818 | 49.97% | 537 | 32.80% | 282 | 17.23% | 1,637 |
| 2 | 171 | 36.30% | 146 | 31.00% | 154 | 32.70% | 471 |
| 3 | 274 | 42.88% | 181 | 28.33% | 184 | 28.79% | 639 |
| 4 | 1,416 | 63.61% | 539 | 24.21% | 271 | 12.18% | 2,226 |
| 5 | 1,113 | 43.68% | 770 | 30.22% | 665 | 26.10% | 2,548 |
| 6 | 1,106 | 42.61% | 1,331 | 51.27% | 159 | 6.12% | 2,596 |
| 7 | 1,915 | 46.37% | 1,169 | 28.30% | 1,046 | 25.33% | 4,130 |
| 8 | 1,479 | 38.49% | 1,326 | 34.50% | 1,038 | 27.01% | 3,843 |
| 9 | 1,801 | 30.63% | 1,617 | 27.51% | 2,461 | 41.86% | 5,879 |
| 10 | 1,058 | 36.93% | 1,016 | 35.46% | 791 | 27.61% | 2,865 |
| 11 | 2,029 | 40.33% | 1,835 | 36.47% | 1,167 | 23.20% | 5,031 |
| 12 | 1,031 | 42.82% | 823 | 34.18% | 554 | 23.00% | 2,408 |
| 13 | 1,395 | 43.36% | 936 | 29.10% | 886 | 27.54% | 3,217 |
| 14 | 1,660 | 55.10% | 979 | 32.49% | 374 | 12.41% | 3,013 |
| 15 | 1,041 | 30.50% | 1,185 | 34.72% | 1,187 | 34.78% | 3,413 |
| 16 | 1,892 | 38.11% | 1,299 | 26.17% | 1,773 | 35.72% | 4,964 |
| 17 | 2,542 | 38.77% | 2,064 | 31.48% | 1,951 | 29.75% | 6,557 |
| 18 | 2,308 | 44.27% | 1,617 | 31.01% | 1,289 | 24.72% | 5,214 |
| 19 | 1,388 | 45.24% | 805 | 26.24% | 875 | 28.52% | 3,068 |
| 20 | 2,410 | 39.75% | 1,667 | 27.50% | 1,985 | 32.75% | 6,062 |
| 21 | 1,954 | 42.38% | 1,270 | 27.54% | 1,387 | 30.08% | 4,611 |
| 22 | 1,401 | 40.73% | 867 | 25.20% | 1,172 | 34.07% | 3,440 |
| Totals | 32,202 | 41.37% | 23,979 | 30.81% | 21,651 | 27.82% | 77,832 |
