= Dropping the Pilot =

1890 political cartoon by John Tenniel

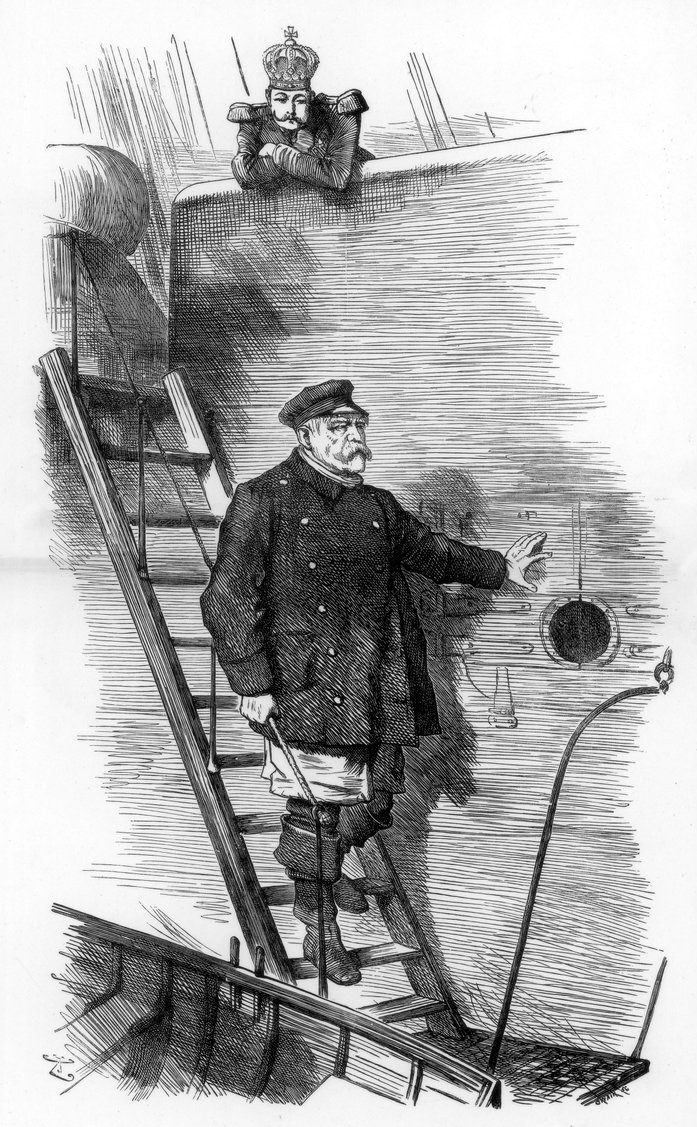
Dropping the Pilot. Cartoon by Sir John Tenniel (1820–1914), first published in the British magazine Punch, 29 March 1890

Dropping the Pilot is a political cartoon by Sir John Tenniel, first published in the British magazine Punch on 29 March 1890. It depicts Chancellor Otto von Bismarck as a maritime pilot who is stepping off a ship, perhaps a reference to Plato's ship of state, idly and unconcernedly watched by a young Wilhelm II, German Emperor. Bismarck had resigned as Chancellor at Wilhelm's demand just ten days earlier on 19 March because of political differences.

After the cartoon's publication, Tenniel received a commission from the 5th Earl of Rosebery to create a copy to be sent to Bismarck himself. The former chancellor reportedly replied, "It is indeed a fine one".

The cartoon is well known in Germany and often used in history textbooks and school books, under the title The Pilot Leaves the Ship (German: Der Lotse geht von Bord).

== Adaptations ==
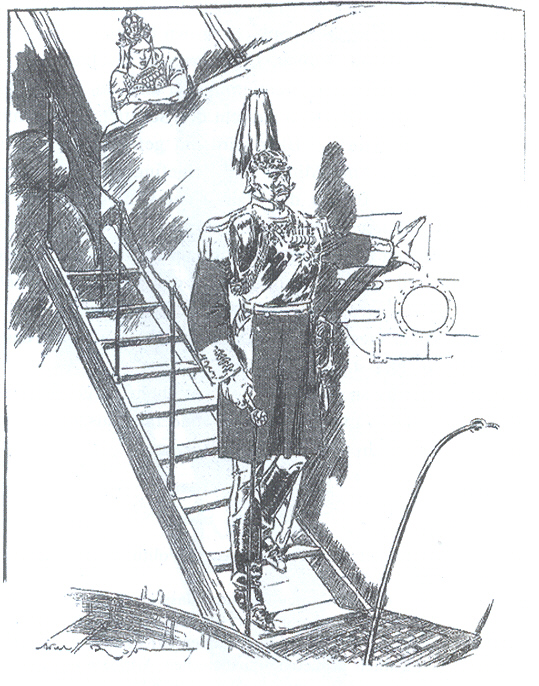
Prophecy? (Dropping the Pilot) by Will Dyson, 1914

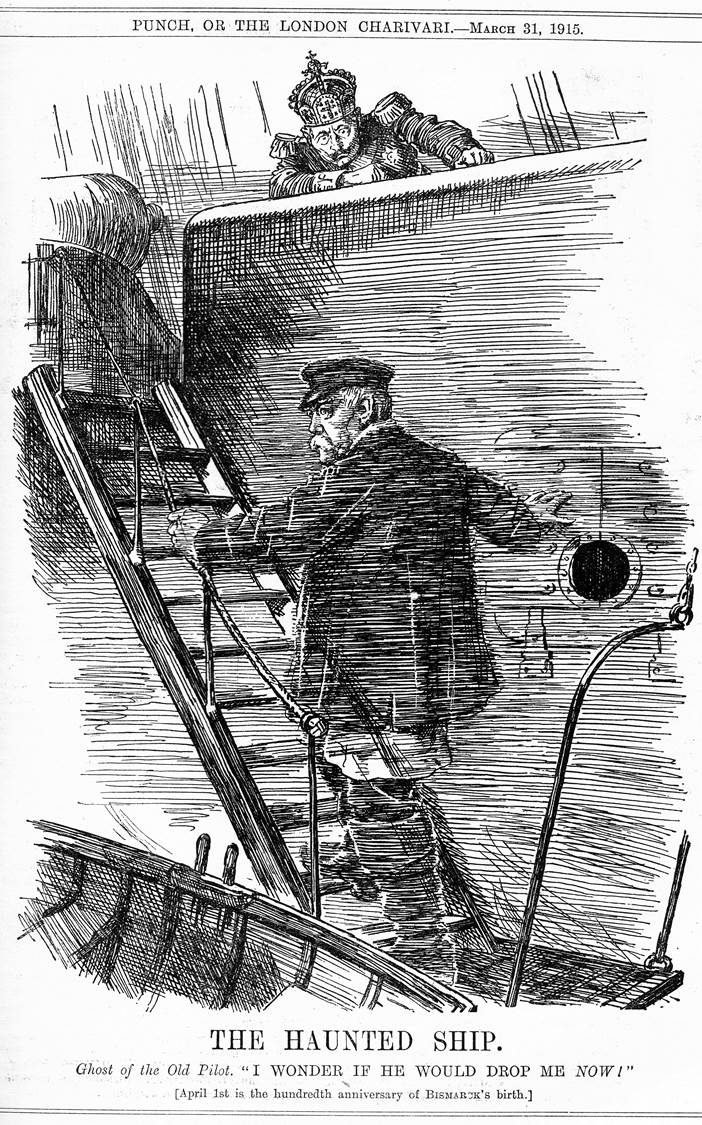
The Haunted Ship by Bernard Partridge, 1915

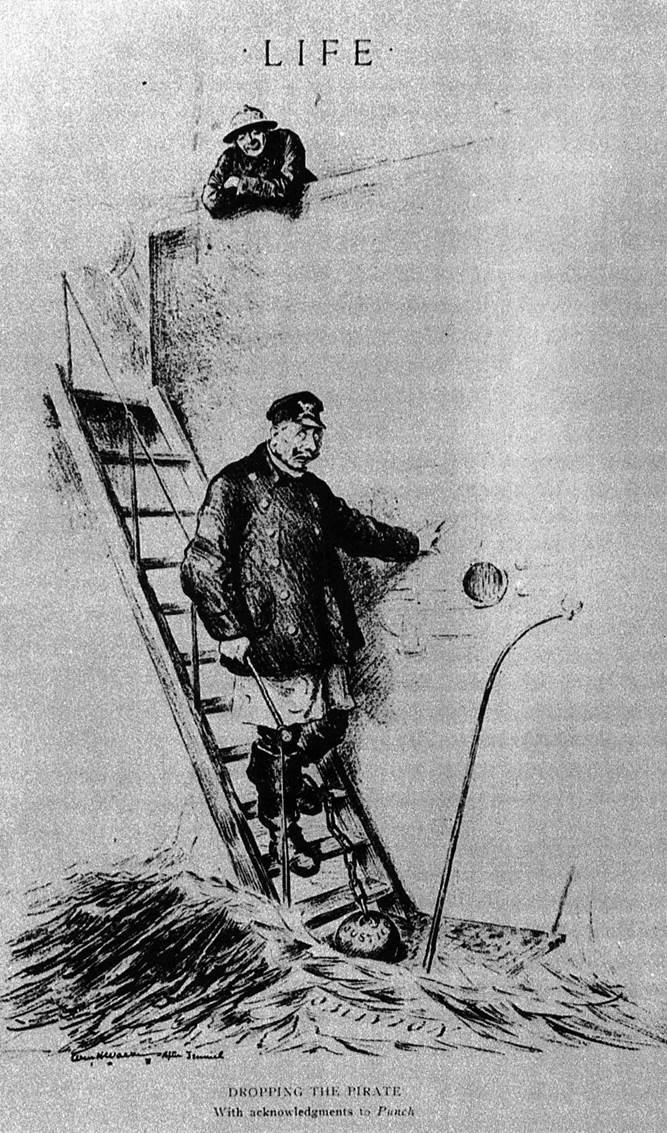
Dropping the Pirate by William H. Walker, 1918
- Dropping the pilot, referring to Kaiser Wilhelm's removal from the list of Royal Navy admirals in 1914, by David Low
- Dropping the pilot, referring to Winston Churchill, by Daniel Bishop
- Cartoon Dropping the Pilots showing Khrushchev looking down as the four "Pilots" leave the ship of state.
- Cartoon showing the pilot Abraham Lincoln being "Dropped" from the "Grand Old Party" By Captain Barry Goldwater
- Cartoon showing Margaret Thatcher being "Dropped as the Pilot"
- Steve Bell of The Guardian has adapted the cartoon:
  - Vice-president faces isolation after key ally leaves Pentagon
  - Iraqis celebrate the withdrawal of American combat troops
  - David Cameron's response to Coulson's guilt
  - Dropping the pornbot (Resignation of Damian Green)
- Martin Rowson of The Guardian has also adapted the cartoon repeatedly:
  - Steve Hilton's Exit
  - Undropping the Pilot
  - The resignation of Michael Flynn
  - Dropping The Pilate on the resignation of Liz Truss after only 45 days in office
