= The Course of Time =

1827 poem by Robert Pollok

- Author: Robert Pollok
- Illustrator: John Tenniel, Myles Birket Foster, and J. R. Clayton (1857 edition)
- Language: English
- Genre: Blank verse poetry
- Publisher: William Blackwood and Sons
- Publication date: 1827
- Publication place: Scotland

The Course of Time is a ten-book poem in blank verse, first published in 1827. It was the last published and most famous work of Scottish poet Robert Pollok. The first edition of the poem sold 12,000 copies, and by its fourth edition it had sold 78,000 copies and become well known even in North America.

Pollok himself died in September 1827, only a few months after the poem was published.

An illustrated edition was published in 1857, featuring the work of John Tenniel, Myles Birket Foster, and J. R. Clayton.
