= Robert Pollok (poet) =

Scottish poet

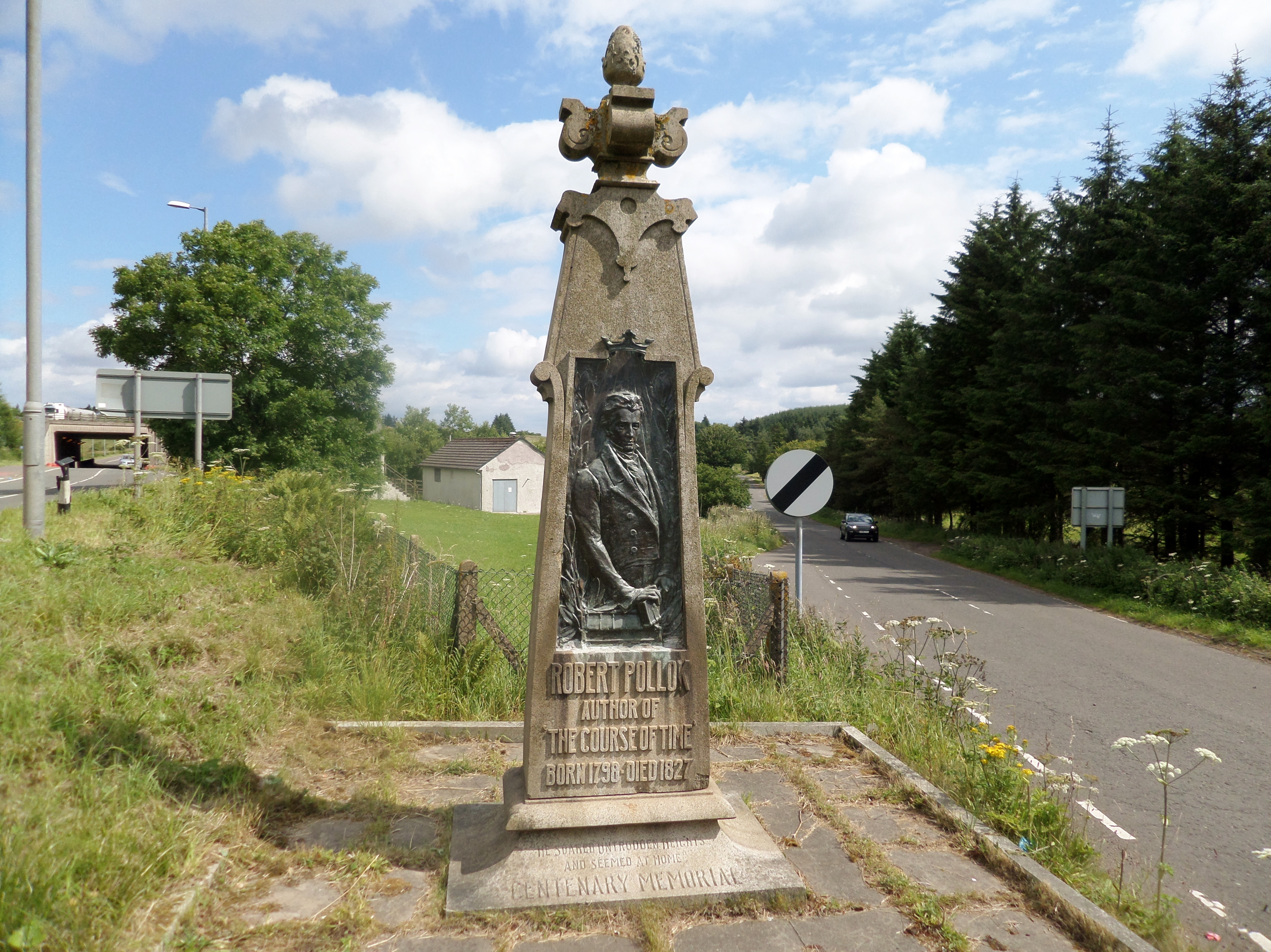
- Robert Pollok Centenary Memorial, Mearns Road, Loganswell, East Renfrewshire
- Born: 19 October 1798; Loganswell, Renfrewshire (now East Renfrewshire), Scotland
- Died: 15 September 1827 (aged 28); Shirley, Hampshire, England
- Occupation: Poet

Robert Pollok (19 October 1798 – 15 September 1827) was a Scottish poet best known for his work, The Course of Time, published in the year of his death.

== Biography ==
Pollok was born at North Moorhouse Farm, Loganswell, Renfrewshire, Scotland (now East Renfrewshire). Sources differ on the exact year of his birth, some giving 1789, some 1798, and some 1799. He studied at the University of Glasgow for the ministry of the United Secession Church. During this time, he anonymously published three poems: Helen of the Glen, The Persecuted Family, and Ralph Gemmell. After Pollok's death, these would be published together under his name as Tales of the Covenanters.

In 1827, shortly before leaving the university, Pollok published what was to be his final and most famous work, The Course of Time, a ten-book poem in blank verse. By its fourth edition, The Course of Time had sold 78,000 copies and was popular as far away as North America.

Later that year, suffering from tuberculosis, Pollok was advised by his doctors to travel to Italy. He left Scotland with this intention, but his health worsened rapidly, and he died at Shirley (now a part of Southampton), England on 15 September.

He was buried in the nearby churchyard of St Nicholas, Millbrook. When the church was demolished, his memorial obelisk was removed and now stands in the grounds of Holy Trinity Church, Millbrook. Another monument to Pollok stands south of Newton Mearns, at his birthplace of Loganswell, Scotland, at the junction of the Glasgow/Ayr Road and the old Mearns Road. It was unveiled on 24 September 1900, and bears the inscription "Robert Pollok, Author of 'The Course of Time' / Born 1798 Died 1827 / He soared untrodden heights and seemed at home".
