= Alice in Wonderland (1983 film) =

- Genre: Drama; Musical
- Based on: Alice's Adventures in Wonderland and Through the Looking-Glass by Lewis Carroll
- Directed by: Kirk Browning
- Starring: Kate Burton; Richard Burton; Geoffrey Holder; Eve Arden; Nathan Lane
- Music by: Richard Addinsell
- Country of origin: United States
- Original language: English

Production
- Executive producer: Jac Venza
- Producer: Ann Blumenthal
- Cinematography: Nick Besink
- Running time: 90 min.
- Production companies: WNET Channel 13 New York; Great Performances; KQED; PBS

Original release
- Network: PBS
- Release: October 3, 1983

A 1982 Broadway stage performance of Alice in Wonderland was telecast on PBS's Great Performances in 1983. Directed by Kirk Browning, it was produced by PBS affiliate WNET in New York. Black-and-white papier-mâché costumes aimed to re-create the book's original artwork by John Tenniel.

The production was not recorded on film, but on videotape. It starred Kate Burton as Alice, and her father, Richard Burton, as the White Knight. Other notable roles included Nathan Lane as the Mouse, Geoffrey Holder as the Cheshire Cat, Andre De Shields as Tweedledum, and Eve Arden as the Queen of Hearts.

The production was a revival of actress-director Eva Le Gallienne and Florida Friebus's famous 1932 stage adaptation of Lewis Carroll's novel. It had been presented on Broadway in 1982 with Ms. Burton in the lead, but with an otherwise different cast featuring the Mirror Repertory Company. The videotaping was not made in a theatre with a live audience, but in a television studio, much as the 1960 version of Peter Pan had been years before.

The Le Gallienne-Friebus adaptation had previously served as the unofficial basis for the all-star 1933 Paramount Pictures film version of the novel, which featured Charlotte Henry as Alice. The stage production was successfully revived on Broadway in 1947 with Bambi Linn in the title role, and an abridged 6-record 78-RPM album featuring the revival's cast was made by RCA Victor.

The 1983 TV adaptation of the stage production was not the first. It had previously been telecast in 1955 by NBC, as part of the Hallmark Hall of Fame.

== Cast ==
- Kate Burton as Alice
- Austin Pendleton as White Rabbit
- Nathan Lane as Mouse
- Fritz Weaver as Caterpillar
- Kaye Ballard as Duchess
- Geoffrey Holder as Cheshire Cat
- Andre Gregory as Mad Hatter
- Željko Ivanek as March Hare
- Eve Arden as Queen of Hearts
- James Coco as King of Hearts
- Tony Cummings as Knave of Hearts
- Swen Swenson as Gryphon
- Donald O'Connor as Mock Turtle
- Colleen Dewhurst as Red Queen
- Andre De Shields as Tweedledum
- Alan Weeks as Tweedledee
- Maureen Stapleton as White Queen
- Richard Woods as Humpty Dumpty
- Richard Burton as White Knight
- Dean Badolato as Six of Hearts/Dormouse
- Bill Badolato as Seven of Spades
- Mercedes Ellington as Five of Hearts/Eaglet
- David Gold as Five of Spades/Lory/Frog Footman
- Frantz Hall as Two of Spades/Dodo
- Dirk Lumbard as Ten of Hearts/Cook
- Robert Meadows as Seven of Hearts
- Kirby Tepper as Three of Clubs/Fish Footman
- S. Addis Williams as Puppeteer
- William Connelly as Puppeteer
