= Alice in Wonderland (Le Gallienne and Friebus) =

1932 stage adaptation of Lewis Carroll's novels

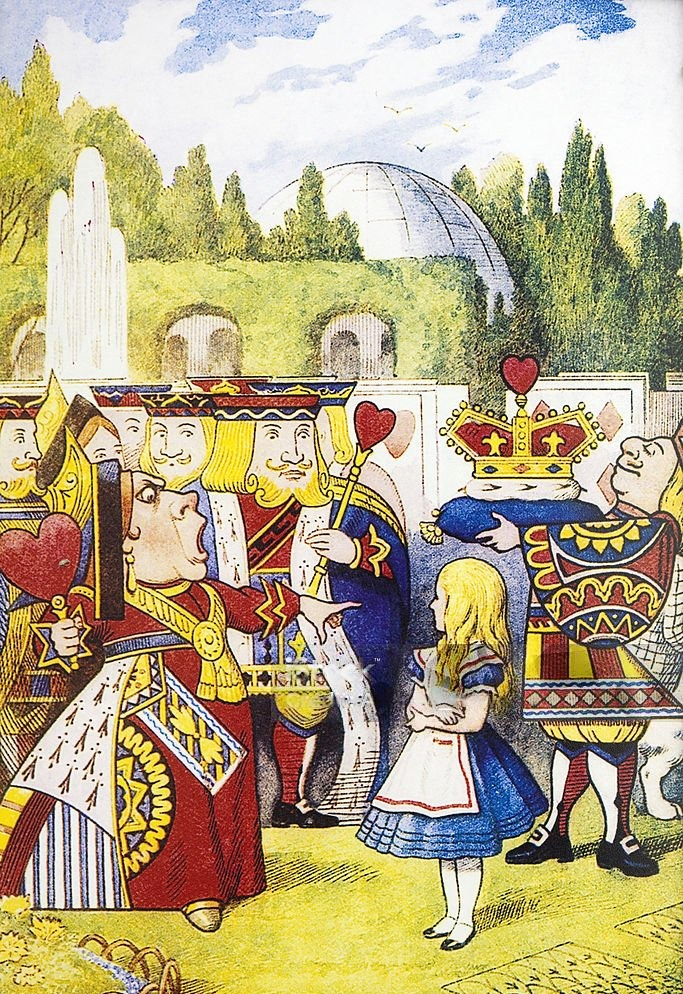
John Tenniel's illustration of the Queen of Hearts ordering Alice's beheading.

Alice in Wonderland is a play in two acts created by Eva Le Gallienne and Florida Friebus that was adapted from Lewis Carroll's 1865 English children's novel Alice's Adventures in Wonderland, and its 1871 sequel Through the Looking-Glass. The play contains no original text and only uses dialogue found within Carroll's novels, with Le Gallienne and Friebus making cuts and reordering scenes from the two books to craft together a single stage work. The play also incorporates elements of musical theatre, containing original incidental music, dances, and songs composed by Richard Addinsell. The story's plot lacks a linear narrative and instead presents Alice's adventures within a series of vignettes. The play's major productions have all emphasized costumes, sets, and makeup that are meant to closely mirror the artwork of John Tenniel who illustrated both of Carroll's books in their original publications. As a result of both the plot structure and the emphasis on visual presentation, the work has been compared to a pageant. Some writers have also connected the piece to British pantomime.

Alice in Wonderland was first staged at the Civic Repertory Theatre in Manhattan in 1932, a production that transferred to Broadway's New Amsterdam Theatre the following year. It was revived on Broadway in 1947 where it opened at the International Theatre before ending its run at the Majestic Theatre. It returned to Broadway in 1982-1983 for a revival at the Virginia Theatre directed by Le Gallienne. The latter production was an expensive flop and closed after a short run. A re-tooled version of this production was filmed for PBS's Great Performances under new direction by Kirk Browning and with cast changes that included the addition of several famous actors, among them Richard Burton whose daughter, Kate Burton, played Alice. The play was also adapted by Friebus for a 1955 television version broadcast on the Hallmark Hall of Fame in which Le Gallienne played the role of the White Queen, a part she also portrayed in all of the major stage productions, including the 1982 revival when she was 83 years old.

== Creation ==
Alice in Wonderland was created for the Civic Repertory Theatre (CRT), an organization founded by Eva Le Gallienne in 1926 with the purposes of operating as a repertory theatre at affordable prices to the general public. While the company only lasted until January 1933, it made a mark on the history of American theatre, with The New York Times stating in 1991 that "[Le Gallienne] came closer than any other person to endowing the United States with a permanent company performing repertory in the manner of the Old Vic, the Comedie Francaise and the Moscow Art Theater.

Prior to Alice in Wonderland, the CRT had previously adapted Peter Pan for the stage successfully, and Le Galliene wanted to create a second work in the company's repertoire that would appeal to families, with an eye towards making the piece attractive to adults and not just children. She selected Alice's Adventures in Wonderland specifically because she felt the book was "by no means primarily for children". She proceeded to enlist actress Florida Friebus to assist her in adapting both this novel and its sequel, Through the Looking-Glass, for the CRT stage. Joining them in this collaboration was an artist new to design, Irene Sharaff, whose previous experience was as a fashion illustrator. This play was Sharaff's first work as a set and costume designer, and she went on to have a distinguished career which included winning the Academy Award for Best Costume Design five times.

In constructing Alice in Wonderland, Le Gallienne and Friebus chose the scenes which they felt would best translate to the stage from Carroll's two Alice novels. The resulting work dramatized the most famous scenes from these books, but abandoned a linear narrative in favor of presenting the story as a series of vignettes. No new dialogue was added to the play, with every spoken word coming directly from Carroll's stories. However, the chronological sequence of the scenes were rearranged from the order they appear in Carroll's telling of Alice's adventures.

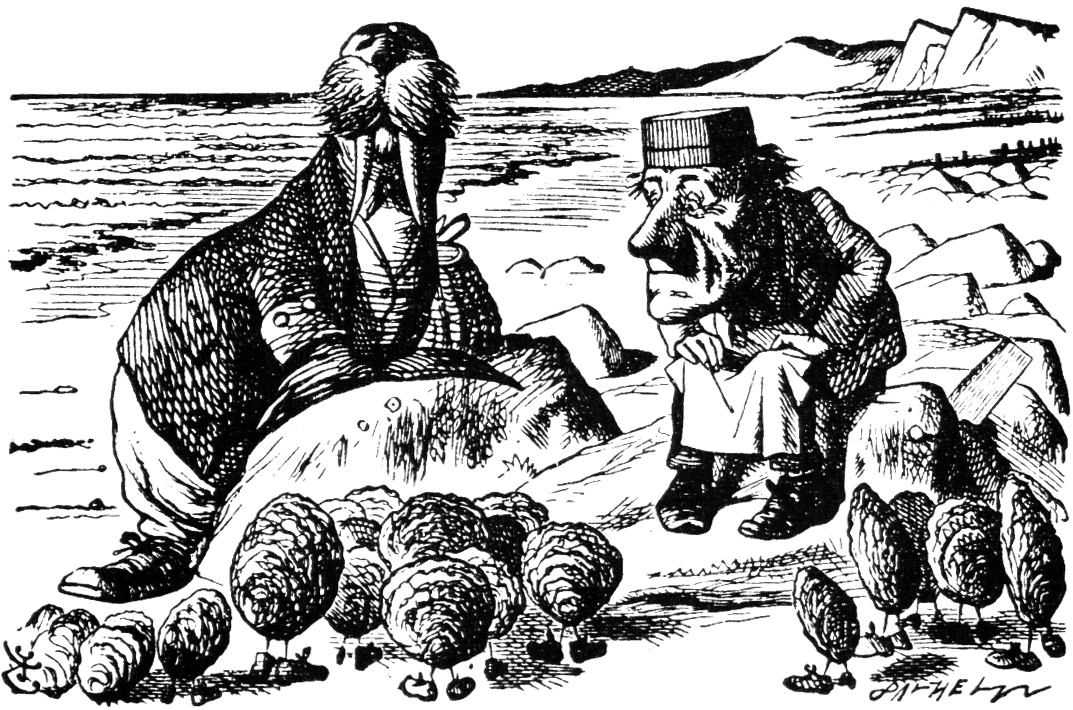
The Walrus and the Carpenter speaking to the Oysters, as portrayed by Tenniel

Le Gallienne and Friebus believed that the character of Alice was essential to the forwarding of the plot's action, and for that reason they designed the play in such a way that the actress playing Alice would never leave the stage. In order to accomplish this, Sharaff employed a cyclorama design so that new sets and characters could be revolved to Alice without her ever leaving the audience's view. Together, Sharaff and Le Gallienne constructed a background that was 400 yards long and was wound up within two giant drums that could roll. The backdrop could be unwound and move across the stage to change the scenery. Kinetic platforms were also created and were situated at the front of the stage. Cut outs within the scenery were made which allowed for both actors and puppets to weave through the set. Marionettes were used for The Walrus and the Carpenter scene.

Le Gallienne and Friebus also wanted a play that used sets and costumes based closely on the illustrations by John Tenniel from Carroll's books in order to make the "book come alive" on the stage. Sharaff fulfilled this purpose, and her designs mirrored Tenniel's "down to the smallest prop". Writing for the Museum of the City of New York, photographer Lissa Rivera stated that "The resulting product had a magical effect, as if the engravings had been conjured to life. Alice's costumes and sets shifted seamlessly together, creating a world where drawings moved across the pages of a book on their own."

In response to the play's construction, theatre critics, such as Brooks Atkinson and Frank Rich, have compared Le Gallienne and Friebus' work to a pageant. Atkinson stated the following:

"Since Eva Le Gallienne and Florida Freibus have a wholesome respect for Alice in Wonderland they have committed no violence. Their stage transcription recaptures more of the innocent nonsense of the book than you would think possible. Inasmuch as the Oxford don wrote it for saucer-eyed reading rather than acting, do not blame the collaborators if they have not turned it precisely into a play. Rather have they related it in a frankly make-believe pageant of Tenniel scenes and Tenniel costumes to the wood notes wild of Richard Addinsell."

While billed as a play, Alice in Wonderland adopted aspects of musical theatre with a score by Richard Addinsell that encompassed incidental music, dance music, and some songs.

== Plot ==
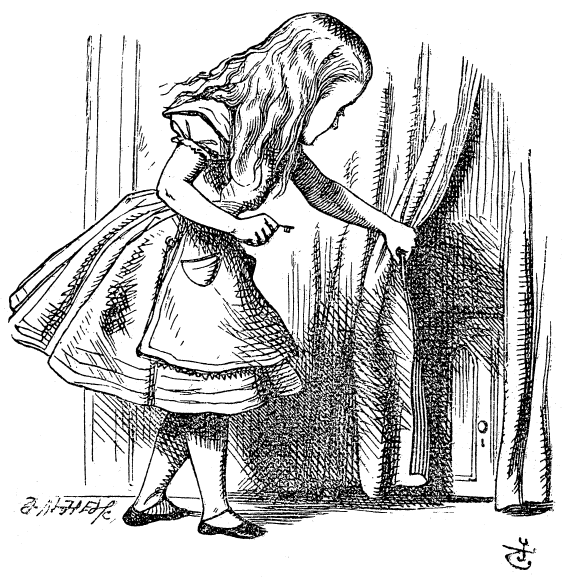
Alice discovers the tiny door that leads into Wonderland's garden.

Act 1
As Alice, a seven-and-a-half years old girl, plays chess with her cat, Dinah, she describes her imagination about a Looking-Glass House. The rooms in the house are similar to the ones in her home but appear backwards. She decides that she is going to make-believe that the entrance to her home is through the looking glass that hangs in her drawing room. As she tells of this imagined entrance, the real looking glass transforms into a portal and Alice goes through it into a different world, "Wonderland".

Upon Alice's arrival in Wonderland, she discovers a book and begins to read from it the nonsense poem "Jabberwocky". She next observes The White Rabbit rushing along and complaining about being late. She unsuccessfully attempts to follow him and comes to a tiny door leading to a garden which she is unable to fit through. Beside this door there is a table with a key and a bottle labeled "Drink Me" sitting on top of it. Alice drink's from the bottle and begins to shrink; eventually reaching the correct height to go through the door. However, she forgot to grab the key from the table and cannot open it. Alice starts crying profusely in frustration and her tears create a large pool of water in which she starts swimming. In this pool she comes across the Mouse whom she asks for help in finding a way out of the pool. Once on land, the mouse decides to assist in drying them off by reciting the "driest thing I know".

Alice is introduced to the Lory, the Duck, and the Dodo by the Mouse, and the group proceeds to engage in nonsensical game called a caucus-race (a satire of political campaigns). After this ends, Alice wanders off by herself in Wonderland where she encounters a series of strange characters; among them the Caterpillar, the Frog-Footman, the Duchess, and a Cheshire Cat, the latter of whom appears and disappears at a whim. With each character Alice makes observations which compare the rules and customs of her world with this strange new world.

Alice arrives at a tea party where she meets the Mad Hatter, the March Hare, and the Dormouse. From them she is informed about the foul-tempered and oppressive Queen of Hearts. After leaving this party, Alice meets the Queen of Hearts when she wanders into her garden. The queen bids Alice to join her in a game of croquet, but with live flamingos used as mallets. Alice plays poorly and the game ends rapidly. The Queen commands her courtier, the Gryphon, to introduce Alice to the Mock Turtle. The Mock Turtle begins a recitation of a grim life story but is interrupted by the White Rabbit who informs the court that a trial accusing the Knave of Hearts of theft is about to start.

A trial full of illogical arguments and outrageous antics ensues which confounds Alice. Frustrated, she interrupts the proceedings and denounces the trial as nonsense. The Queen of Hearts orders Alice's beheading as punishment.

Act 2
Alice runs and escapes the Queen of Hearts's guards into a land shaped like a gigantic chessboard. There she meets another queen, the Red Queen, who advises Alice on traversing through the squares. She informs Alice that she will become a queen when she arrives at the eighth square on the board.

As Alice travels through the chessboard squares she encounters more strange characters; among them a railroad guard, the twins Tweedledum and Tweedledee, the White Queen, The Sheep, Humpty Dumpty, and the White King. Upon reaching the eighth square she is crowned a co-regent with the Red and White Queens, and a banquet is held in Alice's honor. Alice becomes overwhelmed by the attention of Wonderland's characters at the party and proclaims she can take no more. Wonderland suddenly vanishes and Alice wakes up in her own home next to Dinah her cat. She realizes her adventure was only a dream.

== Musical numbers by scene ==
Taken from the liner notes of the 1947 Broadway cast recording.

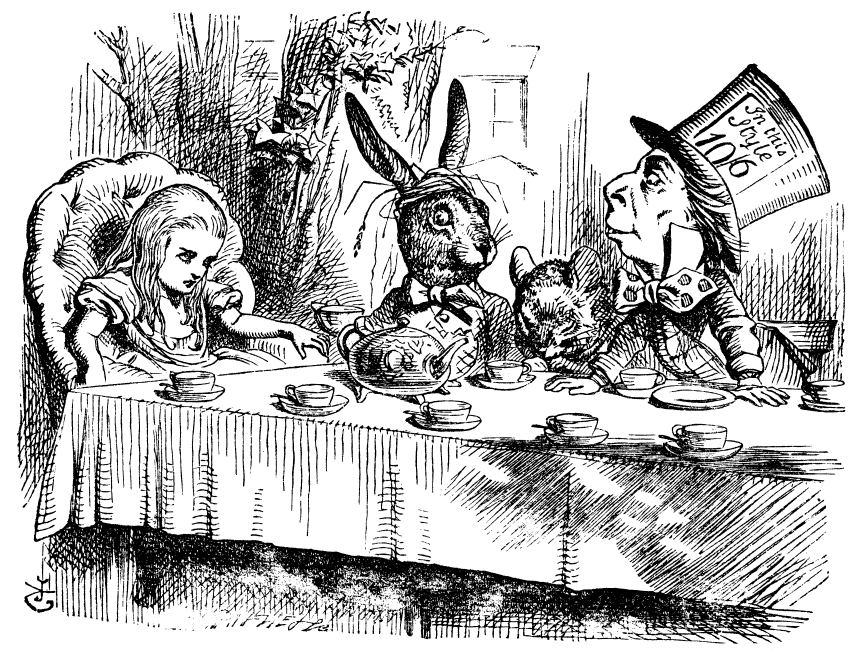
Alice at the Mad Hatter's tea party. Illustration by John Tenniel.

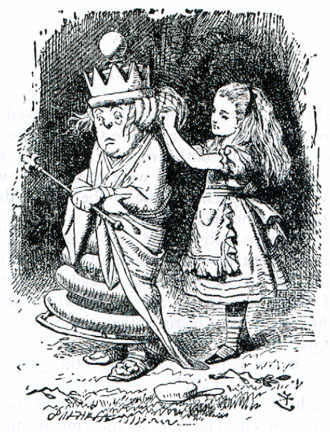
Alice with the White Queen as drawn by Tenniel

Act 1

- Opening- "A Boat Beneath a Sunny Sky" (sung by Ensemble)
- Into the Looking Glass World- "Jabberwocky" (spoken to music by Alice)
- The White Rabbit- incidental music
- The Pool of Tears- incidental music
- The Caucus Race- incidental music
- The Caterpillar- "You Are Old, Father William" (spoken by Alice) / incidental music
- The Footmen- "Speak roughly to your little boy" (sung by Duchess) / incidental music
- The Cheshire Cat- incidental music
- The Mad Hatter's Tea Party- incidental music
- The Gryphon and the Mock Turtle- "Will you walk a little faster" (sung by the Mock Turtle), "Beautiful soup" (sung by the Mock Turtle)
- The Trial- "They told me you had been to her" (sung by The White Rabbit and Ensemble) / incidental music for the "Collapse of the pack of cards"

Act 2

- The Red Queen- incidental music
- Running with the Red Queen- incidental music
- The White Queen- incidental music
- Humpty Dumpty- incidental music
- The White Night- "A-sitting on a gate" (sung by The White Knight)
- The Red Queen and the White Queen- "Lullaby" (sung by the Red Queen)
- Queen Alice- "To the looking-glass world" (sung by Ensemble)
- The End of Looking Glass World- "A Boat Beneath A Summer Sky" (reprise, sung by Ensemble)

== Performance history ==
=== Civic Repertory Theatre/ New Amsterdam Theatre / National Tour (1932–1933) ===
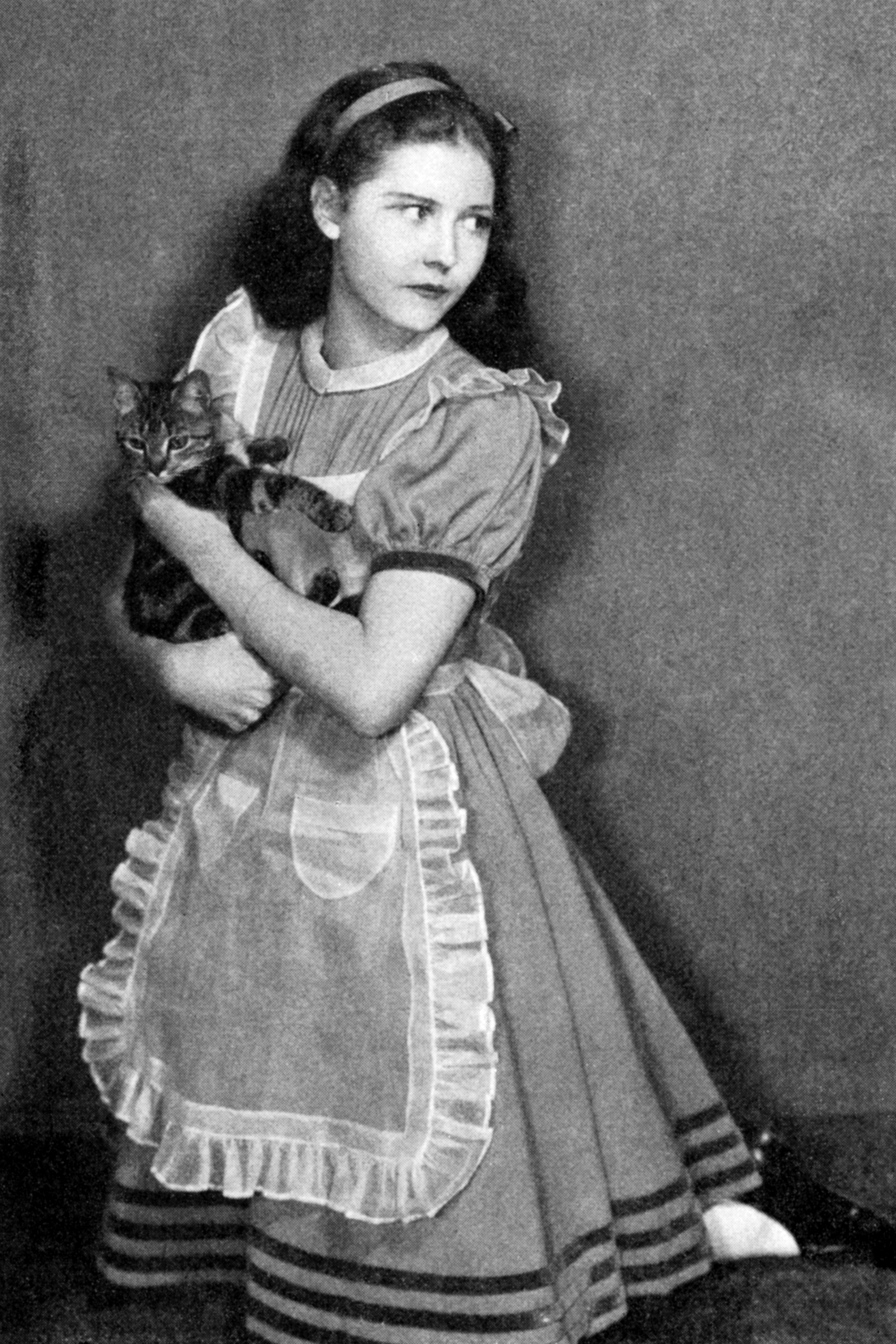
Josephine Hutchinson as Alice in the Civic Repertory Theatre production

Alice in Wonderland premiered at the Civic Repertory Theatre (CRT) on December 12, 1932 during the year marking the centenary of the birth of Lewis Carroll (real name Charles Lutwidge Dodgson). The cast was led by Josephine Hutchinson as Alice. It moved to Broadway's New Amsterdam Theatre.

Proceeds for certain performances of the original production went to the Public Education Association of the City of New York. Tickets for these performances were sold through subscription with several prominent Americans being advertised as subscribers; among them Eleanor Roosevelt.

After the Broadway production closed, Alice in Wonderland toured the United States, beginning its tour in New Haven, Connecticut on October 13, 1933, and proceeding on for performances in cities in Ohio, Kentucky, Illinois, Indiana, Pennsylvania, Minnesota, Missouri, and Iowa. When the tour reached National Theatre in Washington, D.C., in November 1933, First Lady Eleanor Roosevelt attended the production and the following day hosted a luncheon for Le Gallienne at the White House.

The original production had a significant influence on theatre in the United States, and is credited for inspiring a move towards the inclusion of children's theatre works within the repertoires of stock theatre and regional theatre companies throughout America. In 1933 Columbia Pictures expressed interest in adapting Le Gallienne and Friebus's work into a film with Le Gallienne reprising her role on screen.

=== 1947 Broadway revival ===
In 1947 a Broadway revival performed by Eva Le Gallienne's American Repertory Theater company (no relation to the current organization of that name) was produced by Rita Hassan. It opened at the International Theatre on April 5, 1947. Bambi Linn led the cast as Alice. In ran there for 100 performances; closing on June 28, 1947.

=== 1955 Hallmark Hall of Fame adaptation ===
Friebus adapted the play into a shortened version for the NBC television program Hallmark Hall of Fame. It aired on October 23, 1955. It starred 14 year old English actress Gillian Barber as Alice.

=== 1982 Broadway revival and Great Performances broadcast ===
In anticipation of its 50th anniversary, Alice in Wonderland was revived on Broadway at the Virginia Theatre with Le Gallienne, just shy of her 84th birthday, returning to the role she had first portrayed five decades earlier. The production was produced with the financial backing of WNET-TV who gambled that the play would be profit making for the network, and planned for an elaborate filming of the stage production for its television series Great Performances.

Despite high production with a large financial investment, the revival was largely negatively reviewed while maintaining praise for Le Gallienne's performance and the design of the production. The New York Times critic Walter Kerr, stated "As for Alice in Wonderland, which has no drive at all, there are stunning costumes and miles of scenery sadly going to waste... Nothing comes together, nothing but the backgrounds seem to move. In her own brief appearance (excepting Tuesday nights and Wednesday matinees), Miss Le Gallienne indicates that she still knows how to play the piece she helped invent some 50 years ago. A pity she hasn't managed to pass on the secret."

The stage production was significantly reworked for its filming for television with many cast changes and alterations and cuts made to the production while still using the same sets and costumes. It fared much better with critics. Critic John J. O'Connor stated "With considerable inventiveness and more than a little trimming, public television's Great Performances series has transformed a disastrous stage production of Alice in Wonderland into a production of impressive charm."

=== Other productions ===
Director Ian Gallanar staged the work in 2018 for The Chesapeake Shakespeare Company with Alexandra Palting at Alice. In 2019 Emily Ota performed Alice in the Oregon Shakespeare Festival's production of the work which was directed by Sara Bruner. In 2020 Stephanie Shroyer directed Alice in Wonderland for A Noise Within; a production which was closed midway through its run due to the COVID-19 pandemic in the United States.

== Characters and notable casts ==
Characters (in order of appearance)	1932 Civic Repertory Theatre/ 1933 Broadway	1947 Broadway	1955 Hallmark Hall of Fame	1982 Broadway	1983 PBS's Great Performances
Alice	Josephine Hutchinson	Bambi Linn	Gillian Barber	Kate Burton	Kate Burton
White Rabbit	Richard Waring	William Windom (alternated with Julie Harris)	Martyn Green	Curt Dawson	Austin Pendleton
Mouse	Nelson Welch	Henry Jones	NA	John Remme	Nathan Lane
Dodo	Joseph Kramm	John Straub	NA	James Valentine	Frantz Hall
Lory	Walter Beck	Angus Cairns	NA	John Miglietta	David Gold
Eaglet	Robert H. Gordon	Arthur Keegan	NA	Rebecca Armen	Mercedes Ellington
Crab	Landon Herrick	Don Allen	NA	NA	NA
Duck	Burgess Meredith	Eli Wallach	NA	Nicholas Martin	NA
Caterpillar	Sayre Crawley	Theodore Tenley	Noel Leslie	John Heffernan	Fritz Weaver
Fish Footman	Tonio Selwart	Ed Woodhead	Michael Enserro	Geddeth Smith	Kirby Tepper
Frog Footman	Robert F. Ross	Robert Rawlings	Gilbert Mack	Claude-Albert Saucier	David Gold
Cook	Howard Da Silva	Don Allen	Bernard Tone	Richard Sterne	Dirk Lumbard
Duchess	Charles Ellis	Raymond Greenleaf	Bobby Clark	Edward Zang	Kaye Ballard
Cheshire Cat	Florida Friebus	Donald Keyes	Burr Tillstrom	Geddeth Smith	Geoffrey Holder
Dormouse	Burgess Meredith	Don Allen	Alice Pearce	Nicholas Martin	Dean Badolato
Mad Hatter	Landon Herrick	Richard Waring	Mort Marshall	MacIntyre Dixon	André Gregory
March Hare	Donald Cameron	Arthur Keegan	Robert Casper	Josh Clark	Zeljko Ivanek
Two of Spades	David Marks	Eli Wallach	NA	Geoff Garland	Frantz Hall
Five of Spades	Arthur Swenson	Robert Rawlings	NA	Robert Ott Boyle	David Gold
Seven of Spades	Whitner Bissell	John Straub	Donald Keyes	Steve Massa	Bill Badolato
Queen of Hearts	Joseph Schildkraut	John C. Becher	Ronald Long	Brian Reddy	Eve Arden
King of Hearts	Harold Moulton	Eugene Stuckmann	Hiram Sherman	Richard Woods	James Coco
Gryphon	Nelson Welch	Jack Manning	J. Pat O'Malley	Edward Hibbert	Swen Swenson
Mock Turtle	Lester Scharff	Angus Cairns	Burr Tillstrom	James Valentine	Donald O'Connor
Knave of Hearts	David Turk	Fred Hunter	Tom Bosley	John Seidman	Tony Cummings
Three of Clubs	NS	John Behney			Kirby Tepper
Nine of Clubs	NS	Sgt. Thomas Grace			NA
Red Queen	Leona Roberts	Margaret Webster	Elsa Lanchester	Mary Louise Wilson	Colleen Dewhurst
Train Guard	Robert H. Gordon	John Straub	NA	Nicholas Martin	NA
Goat	Richard Waring	Don Allen	NA	Claude-Albert Saucier	NA
Horse	Robert F. Ross (front)/ William S. Phillips (back)	Will Davis (front) /Charles Townley (back)	NA	Josh Clark (front)/ Cliff Rakerd (back)	NA
Beetle	Florida Friebus	Donald Keyes	NA	NA	NA
Gnat	Mary Sarton	Cavada Humphrey	NA	NA	NA
Gentle Voice	Agnes McCarthy	Angus Cairns	NA	NA	NA
Tweedledum	Landon Herrick	Robert Rawlings	Ian Martin	Robert Ott Boyle	André De Shields
Tweedledee	Burgess Meredith	Jack Manning	Don Hanmer	John Remme	Alan Weeks
White Queen	Eva Le Gallienne	Eva Le Gallienne	Eva Le Gallienne	Eva Le Gallienne	Maureen Stapleton
The Sheep	Margaret Love	Theodore Tenley	NA	John Heffernan	NA
Humpty Dumpty	Walter Beck	Henry Jones	Karl Swenson	Richard Woods	Richard Woods
White Knight	Howard Da Silva	Philip Bourneuf	Reginald Gardiner	Curt Dawson	Richard Burton
Old Frog	Sayre Crawley	NA	NA	Edward Hibbert	NA
Shrill Voice	Adelaide Finch	NA	NA	NA	NA

- The cast also includes a chorus of playing cards in the Trial Scene; additional featured singers in the song "A Boat Beneath A Summer Sky" performed at the beginning and end; and puppeteers.
- NA- Not applicable due to cuts or other alterations
- NS- Not specified in the cast list. In the original production many of the card characters were not differentiated in the program and the performers were listed collectively as part of the ensemble; often with only surnames.

== See also ==
- Adrian Mitchell's 2001 play Alice in Wonderland & Through the Looking-Glass, first performed at the Barbican Centre London, by The Royal Shakespeare Company, and filmed. It can be considered a modern successor to Le Gallienne and Friebus's play.
