= Alice in Wonderland (1933 film) =

1933 film

- Theatrical release poster
- Directed by: Norman Z. McLeod
- Screenplay by: Joseph L. Mankiewicz; William Cameron Menzies
- Based on: Alice's Adventures in Wonderland and Through the Looking-Glass by Lewis Carroll
- Produced by: Louis D. Lighton (uncredited)
- Starring: Charlotte Henry; Richard Arlen; Roscoe Ates; Gary Cooper; Leon Errol; Louise Fazenda; W. C. Fields; Skeets Gallagher; Cary Grant; Raymond Hatton; Edward Everett Horton; Roscoe Karns; Baby LeRoy; Mae Marsh; Polly Moran; Jack Oakie; Edna May Oliver; May Robson; Charlie Ruggles; Alison Skipworth; Ned Sparks; Ford Sterling
- Cinematography: Bert Glennon; Henry Sharp
- Edited by: Ellsworth Hoagland (uncredited)
- Music by: Dimitri Tiomkin
- Distributed by: Paramount Pictures
- Release date: December 22, 1933
- Running time: 77 minutes
- Country: United States
- Language: English

Alice in Wonderland is a 1933 American pre-Code fantasy film adapted from the novels by Lewis Carroll. The film was produced by Paramount Pictures, featuring an all-star cast. It is all live action, except for the Walrus and The Carpenter sequence, which was animated by Harman-Ising Studio. The film was seen by Walt Disney, and inspired him to create his company's 1951 animated adaptation.

Stars include W. C. Fields as Humpty Dumpty, Edna May Oliver as the Red Queen, Cary Grant as the Mock Turtle, Gary Cooper as The White Knight, Edward Everett Horton as The Hatter, Charles Ruggles as The March Hare, Richard Arlen as the Cheshire Cat, Baby LeRoy as The Joker, and Charlotte Henry in her first leading role as Alice.

This adaptation was directed by Norman Z. McLeod from a screenplay by Joseph L. Mankiewicz and William Cameron Menzies, based on Lewis Carroll's books Alice in Wonderland (1865) and Alice Through the Looking-Glass (1871). It also drew heavily from Eva Le Gallienne and Florida Friebus's then-recent stage adaptation.

When Paramount previewed the film in 1933, the original running time was 90 minutes. By the time it was shown to the press, it was truncated to 77 minutes. Many reviews, including the savage one in Variety, made a point of how long it seemed at an hour-and-a-quarter. Though being released at this shorter time, it is often mistakenly reported that Universal Pictures edited it when it bought the television rights in the late 1950s. Universal released the film on DVD on March 2, 2010, as the first home video release.

It is the only major live-action Hollywood theatrical production to adapt the original Alice stories. The next major live-action Hollywood production to do so is a two-part adaptation for television in 1985, and the second major live-action Hollywood production for movie theaters to use the title Alice in Wonderland was made by Tim Burton for Disney in 2010 as a sequel to the original story.

== Plot ==
Alice and Dinah live peacefully in their home, until chasing a White Rabbit into a hole. Falling in, Alice is transported to a room of various doors. She drinks a bottle that reads "Drink Me, Not Poison", which makes her grow big. Her tears flood the room while weeping. She eats a cookie and turns tiny. Swimming in her tears, she meets a couple of odd men named Tweedle Dee and Tweedle Dum. She encounters a tea party, where the Mad Hatter and March Hare live. She meets the Cheshire Cat, then she meets Humpty Dumpty, who tells her what an unbirthday is. She leaves and meets a caterpillar and changes size again. Alice returns to her normal size and runs away from the caterpillar and meets the Queen of Hearts. They play croquet by grabbing a flamingo by the neck. Alice is welcomed to a castle, realizing that she is Queen or Princess of the land. The people of Wonderland start to go crazy and gang up on Alice by running towards her. Then, Alice gets choked by the Queen but wakes up in the drawing room, relieved that it was only a dream.

== Cast ==
- Richard Arlen as Cheshire Cat
- Roscoe Ates as Fish Footman
- William Austin as Gryphon
- Gary Cooper as White Knight
- Leon Errol as Uncle Gilbert
- Louise Fazenda as White Queen
- W.C. Fields as Humpty Dumpty
- Alec B. Francis as King of Hearts
- Richard "Skeets" Gallagher as White Rabbit
- Cary Grant as Mock Turtle
- Lillian Harmer as The Cook
- Raymond Hatton as The Mouse
- Charlotte Henry as Alice
- Sterling Holloway as Frog Footman (Note: Holloway would later star in Disney's 1951 film adaptation as the voice of the Cheshire Cat.)
- Edward Everett Horton as The Hatter
- Roscoe Karns as Tweedledee
- Baby LeRoy as The Joker
- Mae Marsh as The Sheep
- Polly Moran as The Dodo
- Jack Oakie as Tweedledum
- Edna May Oliver as Red Queen
- May Robson as Queen of Hearts
- Charlie Ruggles as March Hare
- Jackie Searl as The Dormouse
- Alison Skipworth as Duchess
- Ned Sparks as Caterpillar
- Ford Sterling as White King

=== Uncredited ===
- Billy Barty as White Pawn/The Pig-Baby
- Billy Bevan as Two of Spades
- Colin Campbell as Frog Gardener
- Jack Duffy as Leg of Mutton
- Meyer Grace as the Third Executioner
- Ethel Griffies as Ms. Simpson
- Charles McNaughton as Five of Spades
- Patsy O'Byrne as Aunt
- George Ovey as Plum Pudding
- Will Stanton as Seven of Spades
- Joe Torillo as Second Executioner

== Reception ==
Its status as a box office bomb cast doubt on whether a live-action fantasy with strange-looking characters could be successfully presented on the screen, until MGM's The Wizard of Oz (1939). It was banned in China under a category of "superstitious films" for its "strangeness" and unscientific elements.

Variety magazine said that the timeless classic book is too surrealistic and adult-oriented to have a good film adaptation. It said the film is "vividly realized" with genuine humor and a satisfying literary treatment, and the cast is "a stunning aggregation of screen names", but the experience is a non-sequitur "volume of separate four-line gags".
