= Alice in Wonderland (1988 film) =

1988 Australian 51-minute direct-to-video animated film

- Title card
- Directed by: Rich Trueblood
- Written by: Paul Leadon
- Based on: Alice's Adventures in Wonderland by Lewis Carroll
- Produced by: Roz Phillips
- Starring: Olivia Martin; Philip Hinton; Paul Johnstone; Moya O'Sullivan; Keith Scott
- Cinematography: Robert Jacobs
- Edited by: Mark D'Arcy Irvine; Peter Jennings; Caroline Neave
- Music by: Mark Isaacs
- Production company: Burbank Films Australia
- Distributed by: NuTech Digital
- Release date: 10 July 1988 (Australia)
- Running time: 51 minutes
- Country: Australia
- Language: English

Alice in Wonderland is an Australian 51-minute direct-to-video animated film from Burbank Films Australia originally released in 1988.

The film is based on Lewis Carroll's classic English novel, Alice's Adventures in Wonderland, first published in 1865, and was adapted by Paul Leadon. Unlike many other adaptations of the novel, this one did not borrow elements from its sequel, Through the Looking-Glass (1871), combined into one film. Burbank Films Australia produced a 73-minute adaptation of the second novel the year before, in 1987, entitled Alice: Through the Looking-Glass.

== Production ==
This film was produced by Roz Phillips and directed by Rich Trueblood. Quite uncommon among Burbank Films Australia's adaptations of classic literary works, Alice in Wonderland featured one original theme song, composed by Mark Isaacs and sung by Kerrie Biddell.

The copyright in this film is now owned by Pulse Distribution and Entertainment and administered by digital rights management firm NuTech Digital.

== Plot summary ==
Alice is sitting by the riverbank all alone, reading her book entitled The Principles of Logical Calculus when she decides she simply cannot stand reading any further as she is bored and despises being stuck in her beautiful garden, referring to it as a "horrible place". Suddenly, a talking white rabbit wearing a waistcoat and a pocket watch appears out of nowhere, and Alice notices that he is in a big hurry. Curious, Alice runs after the white rabbit, down his burrow, and accidently falls down the rabbit hole. Amazingly, her dress balloons up, acting like a parachute, and she begins to float down past mirrors, books, and other curious objects, all lined up on shelves and cupboards.

Alice continues to float down until she lands in a place called Wonderland. Inside a hall with a multitude of varied passages, Alice opens a tiny door leading to what she believes is the most beautiful garden she could have ever imagined. In the distance, Alice spots a very curious sort of race, called a "Caucus-race", and watches the animals cheer as a small snail defeats the other animals.

During her day in Wonderland, Alice questions all of the interesting characters she meets, including the Duchess (Alice's Adventures in Wonderland) and her Cheshire Cat about the beautiful garden and how to get there. The girl attends a very extraordinary Tea party with two very unusual characters, the Mad Hatter and the March Hare, and is finally invited for a game of croquet with her majesty, the Queen of Hearts (Alice's Adventures in Wonderland). When the Knave of Hearts (Alice's Adventures in Wonderland) is unjustly accused of stealing some of the queen's tarts, Alice confesses the truth and tells the jury that it was really she who took the tarts when they had been offered to her. This ends Alice's day in Wonderland, and upon finding herself once more in her own garden, Alice for a moment believes to have at last found the beautiful garden she had sought, only to realize that she is really at home. After a long day of nonsense and topsy-turvy madness, Alice embraces her book on "logical calculus" and smiles back at the wonderful world she had the pleasure of visiting, if only in a dream. While walking home, Alice sees a few of the animals from her dream such as a cat, a lizard, and a white rabbit. Alice continues walking home as she disappears over a small hill.

== Cast ==
- Olivia Martin – Alice
- Philip Hinton – Mad Hatter/Caterpillar/King Phillip of Hearts/Bill the Lizard/Card Painter
- Paul Johnstone – Cheshire Cat/Chef/The Dormouse/Mock Turtle/Mr Mouse/Duck/Card Painter
- Moya O'Sullivan – Duchess/Queen of Hearts
- Keith Scott – March Hare/White Rabbit/Dodo/Card Painter
