= Rita Hassan =

American actress (1905–1973)

Rita Hassan, born Sophie Hassin and also known by her married name Rita Hassan Blue, (January 5, 1905 – October 13, 1973) was an American actress, theatre critic, and theatrical producer. During the Great Depression she was director of the Experimental Theatre unit of the Federal Theatre Project. In the 1940s she produced three plays on Broadway. She later worked as a theatre critic for Show Business magazine in the 1950s and 1960s, and served as the vice-president of the Drama Desk organization. At the time of her death in 1973 she was a resident artist at the University of Bridgeport.

== Life and career ==
Rita Hassan was born in Brooklyn on January 5, 1905. She was the daughter of Frank Hassin and his wife, Fannie Weissler (also spelled Werssler). The 1910 United States census gives her name as Sophia Hassin, but her 1905 birth certificate gives her name as Sophie Hasin (spelled with one s). She attended grammar school at PS 025 (today the Eubie Blake School) in Brooklyn where she was enrolled under the name Sophie Hassin. She was part of the graduating 8th grade class in 1917.

Hassan trained as an actress in the early 1930s under Lee Strasberg at the Group Theatre in New York City where one of her fellow trainees was Stella Adler. By 1934 she was going by the name of Rita Hassan as a member of the Theatre Mart Group in Brooklyn. That same year she portrayed the stenographer in Howard Lindsay's She Loves Me Not at the Walnut Street Theatre in Philadelphia. After this she was employed as the head of the Experimental Theatre unit of the Federal Theatre Project; a role which involved both directing and producing plays. She left her position in 1938 in order to work for Burgess Meredith at the Actors' Equity Association (AEA). She served as Meredith's executive assistant while he was head of the AEA, and also served in the same capacity for AEA head Arthur Byron.

Hassan was credited as the assistant-set designer for the 1939 play Mamba's Daughters which starred Ethel Waters. With the actor Paul Seymour she co-wrote the book to a musical entitled Free For all which was completed in 1941. In 1942 she produced Herbert B. Ehrmann's play Under This Rood on Broadway at the Windsor Theatre. She produced two more plays on Broadway in the 1940s: Harry Kleiner's Skydrift (1945) and Eva Le Gallienne and Florida Friebus's Alice in Wonderland (1947).

Hassan was a theatre critic for Show Business magazine in the 1950s and 1960s, and also worked as an interviewer for the WQXR radio station. From 1968 until her death 1973 she was a resident artist at the University of Bridgeport where she taught in the university's theatre department. She also served as the vice-president of the Drama Desk organization for part of her career, and was the editor of Mordecai Gorelik's theatre textbook New Theaters for Old.

At the age of 68, Hassan died in Bridgeport, Connecticut on October 13, 1973. She was married to the entertainment lawyer Ira Blue.
