= Fushigi no Kuni no Alice =

Japanese anime television series

- ふしぎの国のアリス
- Genre: Fantasy, adventure
- Based on: Alice's Adventures in Wonderland by Lewis Carroll
- Directed by: Shigeo Koshi; Taku Sugiyama
- Music by: Reijirō Koroku
- Countries of origin: Japan; West Germany; Austria
- Original language: Japanese
- No. of episodes: 52

Production
- Executive producer: Kōichi Motohashi
- Producers: Shigeo Endo; Eiko Tanaka
- Production companies: Nippon Animation; Apollo Film

Original release
- Network: MegaTON (TVO, TV Tokyo) (Japan); ZDF (West Germany)
- Release: October 10, 1983 – March 26, 1984

Fushigi no Kuni no Alice (ふしぎの国のアリス, Fushigi no Kuni no Arisu) is an anime adaptation of the 1865 novel Alice's Adventures in Wonderland which ran on the TV Tokyo network and other local television stations across Japan from October 10, 1983, to March 26, 1984. The television series was a Japanese-German co-production between Nippon Animation and Apollo Films. The television series consists of 52 episodes, but only 26 were broadcast in Japan and in the United States.

== Overview ==
A young girl named Alice follows a White Rabbit into a hole, only to find herself in Wonderland, where she meets many interesting characters, including the mysterious Cheshire Cat and the terrible Queen of Hearts.

The beginning of the series adheres more closely to the original novel, whereas later episodes adapt the sequel to Alice's Adventures in Wonderland, Through the Looking-Glass, starting with episode 18.

One departure from the books is that Alice returns to the real world at the end of each episode, and goes back to Wonderland at the beginning of the next episode. These transitions between the two worlds are depicted as dream-like, and it usually takes Alice a moment to notice her surroundings have changed.

== Characters ==
- Alice (Tarako; Aya Beher (Tagalog dub)): In contrast to her novel counterpart, she is depicted with red hair instead of blonde (though it is described as blonde by her fellow characters), a hat, and a red and white short neck top dress similar in design to her Disney counterpart's blue and white dress. She appears younger due to her anime design (as this is the same case with Dorothy's anime depiction in the anime adaptation of the Wizard of Oz).
- Benny Bunny (Masako Nozawa): Alice's rabbit companion in her adventures throughout Wonderland. Found when Alice buys a magic hat in an old shop, Benny turns out to be the nephew of the White Rabbit, so he gets along fairly well with most of the Wonderlanders. He is always uncomfortable whenever they have to go to the Jabberwocky though, as the dragon is set on making rabbit stew out of him. He is also the only character in the series not originating from Lewis Caroll's stories.
- The White Rabbit: Benny's jittery uncle and one of the Queen of Hearts' associates. He has white fur as his name implies, and often worries about being late for his duties.
- The Cheshire Cat (Issei Futamata): A striped cat with the power to vanish himself and others. In most versions, the Cheshire Cat is portrayed as a smart aleck, but here he's a bit of a bumbler.
- The Queen of Hearts: The usual instigator of the current adventure's problem, the Queen shares the same Rubenesque figure of her Disney counterpart. She wears a yellow dress and has a sloping, pointed nose, a contrast to her counterpart's flat face and red and black gown. Another difference that separates her from most other depictions of the character is that she is the most human out of all of them; she can be reasoned with, and while she does threaten with beheadings, she usually only sends offenders to the dungeon for a few days.
- The King of Hearts: The Queen of Hearts' pushover husband and a good friend of Humpty Dumpty.
- The Jabberwocky: A moody giant dragon living in a castle, beyond the forest. A loner of sorts, he doesn't like visitors that much and usually keeps to himself. Now and then he seems vaguely bent on cooking Alice's rabbit companion Benny Bunny, but he is in the end more grumpy than dangerous, and seems good-natured all in all. Sometimes he ends up helping Alice with her troubles. It is possibly hinted at in "The Little Flute Player" that he may have had a lover in the past.
- The Caterpillar: Ostensibly the wisest out of all of the Wonderlanders, the Caterpillar can also be considered the sanest or most normal real-world-wise. Usually found in an area filled with mushrooms, the Caterpillar smokes from his hooka while listening to the different woes of the Wonderlanders. Alice usually comes to him for advice, which has developed into the two of them having a close friendship.
- White King and White Queen: The other monarchy in Wonderland, while the White King likes to take a snooze, his wife is fixated on playing croquet.
- Tweedle Dee and Tweedle Dum: Two chubby twin brothers who sometimes fight like in their nursery rhyme.
- Duchess: Rarely seen without The Cook, she has a piglet as a child who gets casually thrown about.
- Walrus: A devoted friend of The Carpenter, he is rarely seen without him and was introduced at first as a villain.
- Humpty Dumpty (Shōzō Iizuka): An irritable living egg who often seen walking on a wall and refuses to believe that he is an egg. Though he would wobble on the wall sometimes, he is often fortunate not to fall and shatter.
- Mad Hatter: The hatted man who is fond of putting up tea parties.
- March Hare: The Mad Hatter's closest companion at the tea party.
- Dormouse: Another tea party attendee, the Dormouse is often asleep and therefore aloof. Although he receives a lot accidental abuse from other characters, he never complains. He also seemingly does not do anything besides dozing, although he is seen playing cymbals on one occasion.
- Dodo: An elderly, eccentric Dodo who has shown to have dabbled in magic, he was among the characters whom Alice met while participating in the Caucus Race.
- Mock Turtle: A sensitive Wonderlander that doesn't take much to get him upset, he is usually seen without the Gryphon unlike in the book.
- The Lion and the Unicorn: Two animals who used to fight like in their nursery rhyme at first, but then became friends. They are rarely seen in the show. The Lion is a bit of a coward like his counterpart in The Wonderful Wizard of Oz and the Unicorn can screw his horn back on when it comes off.
- Celia (Kumiko Mizukura; Aya Beher (Tagalog dub)): Alice's sister who often argues with her.
- Mother or Lorina Hannah Liddell (Yoshiko Matsuo): Alice's mother.
- Father or Henry George Liddell (Akio Nojima): Alice's father.

== Music ==
The series uses two pieces of theme music for the original Japanese version. The Japanese opening song is called "Yumemiru Wonderland (夢みるワンダーランド Dreaming Wonderland)", and the Japanese ending song is called "NAZO NAZO yume no kuni (ナゾナゾ夢の国 Mysterious Dreamland)", both sung by the Japanese vocalist Tarako (also the voice actress for Alice).

Disco-style theme music used in European dubs is composed by Christian Bruhn, originally with German lyrics, "Alice im Wunderland".

== Episodes ==
=== Alice in Wonderland ===
Episode	Title (Japanese)	Storyboard	Director	Animation Director
1	Alice and Benny （アリスとベニー）	Taku Sugiyama	Unknown	Takao Ogawa
2	Rabbit Hole （ラビットホール）	Taku Sugiyama	Unknown	Takao Ogawa
3	Alice in the Sea of Tears （涙の海のアリス）	Taku Sugiyama	Unknown	Takao Ogawa
4	Caucus Race （コーカス・レース）	Taku Sugiyama	Unknown	Takao Ogawa
5	Giant Alice （でっかいアリス）	Taku Sugiyama	Unknown	Takao Ogawa
6	Humpty Dumpty （ハンプティ ダンプティ）	Taku Sugiyama	Unknown	Takao Ogawa
7	Big Puppy （大きな仔犬）	Taku Sugiyama	Unknown	Takao Ogawa
8	Nameless Forest （名なしの森）	Taku Sugiyama	Unknown	Takao Ogawa
9	Pirates of the Crow Sea （カラスの海賊）	Taku Sugiyama	Unknown	Takao Ogawa
10	Caterpillar's Advice （キャタピラの忠告）	Taku Sugiyama	Unknown	Takao Ogawa
11	Tall Alice （のっぽのアリス）	Taku Sugiyama	Shigeo Koshi	Takao Ogawa
12	Surprise Baby （びっくりベイビー）	Taku Sugiyama	Unknown	Takao Ogawa
13	Crying Mock Turtle （泣きむしまがい亀）	Taku Sugiyama	Taku Sugiyama	Takao Ogawa
14	Tweedledee & Tweedledum's Showdown （ディーとダムの大決闘）	Taku Sugiyama	Unknown	Takao Ogawa
15	Lion VS Unicorn （ライオンVSユニコーン）	Taku Sugiyama	Unknown	Takao Ogawa; Teruo Handa
16	Queen's Croquet Tournament （クィーンのクローケー大会）	Taku Sugiyama	Shigeo Koshi	Takao Ogawa
17	Cheshire Cat （チェシャキャット）	Taku Sugiyama	Shigeo Koshi	Teruo Handa
18	The Oysters' Great Escape （カキたちの大脱走）	Taku Sugiyama	Shigeo Koshi	Teruo Handa
19	Lobster Quadrille （エビのカドリール）	Taku Sugiyama	Shigeo Koshi	Takao Ogawa
20	Mad Tea Party （おかしなティーパーティ）	Taku Sugiyama	Shigeo Koshi	Takao Ogawa
21	Lovely Circus Land （すてきなサーカスランド）	Taku Sugiyama	Shigeo Koshi	Takao Ogawa; Teruo Handa
22	Hungry Jack （くいしんぼうジャック）	Taku Sugiyama	Shigeo Koshi	Takao Ogawa; Koki Miwa
23	Upside-Down Parade （さか立ち大行進）	Taku Sugiyama	Shigeo Koshi	Teruo Handa
24	Benny Disappears （消えたベニー）	Taku Sugiyama	Taku Sugiyama	Takao Ogawa
25	Secret of Greenland （グリーンランドの秘密）	Taku Sugiyama	Taku Sugiyama	Takao Ogawa
26	Mirror Alice and the Mirror （鏡のアリスと鏡）	Seiji Okuda	Shigeo Koshi	Takao Ogawa; Teruo Handa

=== Through the Looking-Glass ===
1. The Queen's Picnic
2. Bird's of a Feather (The Shy Duck)
3. Washing Day
4. Wool and Water
5. Alice and the Dawson Twins
6. The White Rabbit Leaves Wonderland
7. The Strange Trainride
8. The Corkscrew Mouse
9. The Weathermakers
10. The Giant Kangaroo
11. The Balloon Ride
12. Cloudland
13. An Unpleasant Guest
14. The Little Flute Player
15. The Honey Elephants
16. Little Bill in Love
17. The Pearl of Wisdom
18. The Fixit Pixie
19. The Family Portrait
20. The Magic Potion
21. Octopus (The Vanished Light Fairy)
22. All Things Nice (Many Colored Candles)
23. The Non-Birthday
24. Monkey Business (The Chimpanzee's Child)
25. The Knight's Battle
26. Queen Alice

== English releases ==
=== UK VHS Releases ===
- Alice's Adventures in Wonderland (VC1176): October 1, 1990, episodes: "Alice's Family" and "Down the Rabbit Hole"
- Alice's Adventures in Wonderland: Vol. 2 (VC1188): October 1, 1990, episodes: "The Pool of Tears" and "The Caucus Race"

=== International English release ===
Recently, it was announced that Studio 100 had licensed the anime for an English release and it is distributed by Dreamscape Media.
