= Mark Isaacs =

Australian composer and pianist (b.1958)

- Born: 22 June 1958 (age 68); London, England
- Genres: Classical, jazz
- Occupations: Composer, pianist, conductor
- Website: www.markisaacs.com

Mark Isaacs (born 22 June 1958, London) is an Australian classical and jazz composer and pianist.

Isaacs has also composed and conducted music for film and television.

== Discography ==
List of releases (all are albums, unless otherwise shown), with selected details
Title	Details
Originals	Released: 1980; Format: LP; Label: Battyman Records (BAT 2071)
Preludes	Released: 1987; Format: LP, Cassette; Label: Jarra Hill Records (JHR 2003)
Encounters (with Dave Holland & Roy Haynes)	Released: 1990/1991/1995/2013; Format: LP, Cassette, CD; Label: ABC Jazz (846 220-2)/veraBra (vBr2076)/ABC Jazz (479 785-2)/Gracemusic (GR005)
For Sure	Released: 1993; Format: CD, Cassette; Label: ABC (518 397-2)
Fire	Released: 1995; Format: CD; Label: ABC (479823-2)
Air	Released: 1995; Format: CD; Label: ABC (479824-2)
Water	Released: 1995; Format: CD; Label: ABC (479825-2)
Earth	Released: 1995; Format: CD; Label: ABC (479826-2)
The Elements	Released: 1996; Format: 4-CD boxed set; Label: ABC (479827-2)
Elders Suite (with Kenny Wheeler)	Released: 1997; Format: CD; Label: Grace Recordings (GR001)
On Reflection	Released: 1998; Format: CD; Label: Grace Recordings (GR002)
Closer	Released: 2000; Format: CD; Label: Naxos Jazz (86065-2)
Keeping the Standards (with Jay Anderson & Adam Nussbaum)	Released: 2004; Format: CD; Label: Vorticity (VM011309-1)
Visions	Released: 2005; Format: CD; Label: Vorticity (VM021309-2)
Resurgence (with Vinnie Colaiuta, Bob Sheppard, Jay Anderson, Steve Tavaglione & James Muller)	Released: 2007; Format: CD; Label: ABC Jazz (476 6160)
Tell It Like It Is (as Mark Isaacs Resurgence Band)	Released: 2009; Format: CD; Label: ABC Jazz (270 3869)
Aurora (as Mark Isaacs Resurgence Band)	Released: 2010; Format: CD+DVD; Label: Gracemusic (GR003)
The Wind in the Willows Hush Collection Volume 12 (with members of Goldner String Quartet, Australia Ensemble & Sydney Symphony; narration by Andrew Ford)	Released: 2012; Format: CD; Label: Hush
Children's Songs	Released: 2013; Format: CD; Label: Soundbrush Records SR1029
Duende (as Resurgence)	Released: 2013; Format: CD; Label: Gracemusic (GR004)
Ulpirra Sonatines (with Melissa Doecke)	Released: 2016; Format: CD; Label: Melissa Doecke (MD002)
The Present (EP, with Loretta Palmeiro)	Released: 2020; Format: Digital; Label: Bandcamp
Robin Hood: The Film Music of Mark Isaacs Vol. 1	Released: 2020; Format: 2×CD; Label: 1M1 Records (1M1CD1039)
Forgotten Fields	Released: 2020; Format: Digital; Label: Gracemusic
All Who Travel With Us (with Loretta Palmeiro)	Released: 2020; Format: Digital; Label: Some of Two Parts
Intimacies	Released: 2020; Format: CD; Label: Gracemusic (GR006)
Ravel: Ondine (single)	Released: 2022; Format: Digital; Label: Gracemusic
SONATA: Solo Piano Works Composed and Performed by Mark Isaacs	Released: 2023; Format: Digital/CD; Label: ABC Classic/Gracemusic (GR007)
Grace City (feat. Deborah Dicembre) (E.P.)	Released: 2024; Format: Digital; Label: Gracemusic
Mark Isaacs: Symphony No. 2 (E.P.)	Released: 2025; Format: Digital; Label: Gracemusic
Mark Isaacs: Sonata for Soprano Saxophone and Piano (E.P.)	Released: 2026; Format: Digital; Label: Gracemusic

== Filmography ==
- A Tale of Two Cities (1984)
- The Adventures of Robin Hood (1985)
- Kidnapped (1986)
- Ivanhoe (1986)
- Rob Roy (1987)
- Don Quixote of La Mancha (1987)
- Black Beauty (1987)
- The Wind in the Willows (1988)
- The Black Arrow (1988)
- Alice in Wonderland (1988)
- The Corsican Brothers (1989)
- G.P. (1989-1990) (34 episodes)
- Goldilocks and the Three Bears (1991)
- The Pied Piper of Hamelin (1992)
- The New Adventures of William Tell (1992)
- The New Adventures of Robin Hood (1992)
- Mark Isaacs Symphony No.1: Queensland Symphony Orchestra (2014)

== Awards and nominations ==
=== AIR Independent Music Awards ===
The AIR Awards (or Jägermeister Independent Music Awards) give awards for independent albums in various categories.

Year	Nominee / Work	Award	Result	Ref.
2011	Aurora (as Mark Isaacs Resurgence Band)	Best Independent Jazz Album	Nominated	

=== Albert H. Maggs Composition Award ===
The Albert H. Maggs Composition Award is a commission-based Australian classical composition award. It is administered by the University of Melbourne and is awarded annually in August.

Year	Result	Ref.
2007	Won	

=== ARIA Music Awards ===
The ARIA Music Awards is an annual awards ceremony that recognises excellence, innovation, and achievement across all genres of Australian music. They commenced in 1987.

Year	Nominee / work	Award	Result	Ref.
2007	Resurgence	Best Jazz Album	Nominated	
2009	Tell It Like It Is (as Mark Isaacs Resurgence Band)	Best Jazz Album	Nominated	

=== Art Music Awards ===
The Art Music Awards are presented each year by the Australasian Performing Right Association (APRA AMCOS) and the Australian Music Centre (AMC).

Year	Category	Work	Result	Ref.
2016	Award for Excellence in Jazz	For his sustained contribution over four decades and 2015 Queensland Regional Tour	Nominated (Finalist)	
2021	Performance of the Year – Jazz/Improvised Music	All Who Travel With Us (with Loretta Palmeiro)	Nominated (Finalist)	
2021	Work of the Year: Jazz	All Who Travel With Us (with Loretta Palmeiro)	Nominated (Finalist)	

=== Australia Council Fellowship ===
Australia Council Fellowships of $80,000 support outstanding, established artists' and arts workers' activity and professional development for a period of up to two years.

Year	Result	Ref.
1996	Won	

=== Classical Music Awards ===
The 2008 Classical Music Awards (now Art Music Awards) were presented by APRA and the Australian Music Centre, at The Playhouse, Sydney Opera House.

Year	Category	Work	Result	Ref.
2008	Instrumental Work of the Year	Walk a Golden Mile	Won	
2008	Instrumental Work of the Year	Waltz for Melanie	Nominated	

=== Don Banks Memorial Fellowship ===
The Don Banks Memorial Fellowship was awarded by the Australia Council annually from 1981 to 1996.

Year	Result	Ref.
1984	Won	

=== Jean Bogan Prize for Piano Composition ===
The University of Newcastle presents the Jean Bogan Prize for Piano Composition, which recognises "original and outstanding" solo piano compositions by an Australian composer.

Year	Work	Result	Ref.
2010	Miniatures & Variations	Nominated (Highly Commended)	
2012	Children's Songs	Won (Joint)	

=== Paul Lowin Orchestral Prize ===
The Paul Lowin Orchestral Prize, which is "known as one of Australia's richest prizes for music composition", is awarded to a work scored for modern chamber or symphony orchestra.

Year	Work	Result	Ref.
2013	Invocations for cello & orchestra	Nominated (Highly Commended)	

== Other activities ==
=== Lifeline Australia ===
Isaacs is a volunteer telephone counsellor at Lifeline Australia, the nationwide crisis support and suicide prevention service.
