= Knave of Hearts (Alice's Adventures in Wonderland) =

- Alice character
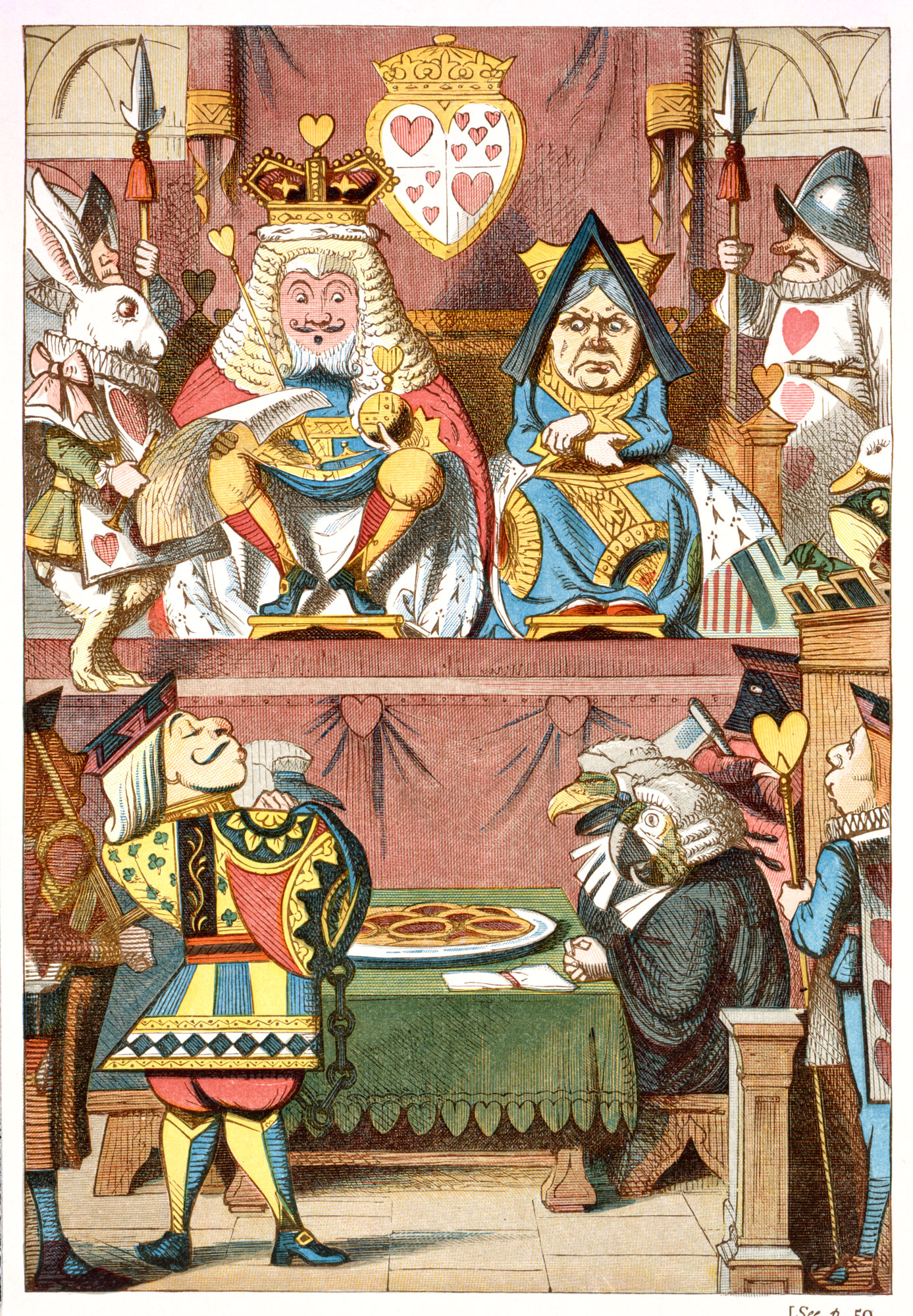
- John Tenniel's illustration of the trial of the Knave of Hearts, with the King and Queen of Hearts above.
- First appearance: Alice's Adventures in Wonderland
- Created by: Lewis Carroll
- Portrayed by: Crispin Glover (Tim Burton's Alice in Wonderland); Paul McGillion (Once Upon a Time); Michael Socha (Once Upon a Time in Wonderland)

In-universe information
- Nickname: Jack of Hearts
- Species: Playing card
- Gender: Male
- Occupation: Knave
- Nationality: Wonderland

The Knave of Hearts is a character from the 1865 book Alice's Adventures in Wonderland by Lewis Carroll.

== Alice's Adventures in Wonderland ==
The Knave of Hearts is mentioned first in chapter 8, and later in chapters 11 and 12, which deal with his trial for a tart burglary in which the King of Hearts presides as judge. Alice eventually defends the Knave after the evidence becomes increasingly absurd and she is called as a witness.

The White Rabbit announces the charges as:

The Queen of Hearts, she made some tarts,

All on a summer day:

The Knave of Hearts, he stole those tarts,

And took them quite away!

The Knave rarely speaks during the trial. The Mad Hatter is called to give evidence but spends his entire time being nervous in front of the King and Queen of Hearts, and the Duchess's cook is summoned to tell the court what tarts are made of. Neither is a convincing witness, and the Knave does not provide the King of Hearts with a very good self-defense. He denies he wrote a letter that mysteriously appears in the court, but that he already knows isn't signed.

Alice diverts the attention of the court by growing ever and ever larger and arguing more and more, lastly with the Queen over the concept of "sentence first—verdict afterwards". Before a verdict can be reached for the Knave's innocence or guilt, Alice reaches full size and forcefulness, and then calls them "nothing but a pack of cards!"

It is believed by some people that since Sir John Tenniel's illustration of the scene in chapter 12 has the Knave with small club outline shapes on his blouse, the ultimate nonsense is that the King and the Queen do not even have the correct person standing trial, this isn't the Knave of Hearts at all, and whoever it is is unwilling to clarify the matter. However, this would also suppose Alice, the White Rabbit, the Mad Hatter and everyone else missed it as well, and that Carroll inserted an unintroduced character. After calling him "the Knave of Hearts" twice in chapter 8, the rest of the chapter simply refers to him as "the Knave". The only other non-heart card characters in the book are the three gardeners (drawn as spades), the ten soldiers (described and drawn as clubs), and the ten courtiers (described as diamonds). For other illustrations involving the Knave, the original art by Carroll for chapter 12 and the chapter 8 drawing by both Carroll and Tenniel show no markings.

== The Knave in adaptations ==
=== Disney animated version(1951) ===
The Knave of Hearts appears briefly in the lineup of card soldiers as the Jack. Alice is put on trial by the Queen of Hearts when the Cheshire Cat made the flamingo she was using to turn her upside down to frames Alice instead of the Knave of Hearts being put on trial for stealing tarts made by the Queen.

=== Tim Burton's Alice in Wonderland ===
Ilosovic Stayne
- First appearance: Alice in Wonderland (2010)
- Created by: Lewis Carroll and Tim Burton
- Portrayed by: Crispin Glover

In-universe information
- Nickname: Knave of Hearts
- Gender: Male
- Occupation: Knave
- Nationality: Wonderland

Crispin Glover played the Knave of Hearts in the 2010 Tim Burton film Alice in Wonderland.

His real name is given as Ilosovic Stayne who has a very tall appearance and wears a heart shaped eye patch covering his scarred left eye.

In the film, the relationship between the Knave and the Red Queen serves more as the Knave being the Queen's personal assassin. However, much like the other servants of the Queen, Stayne secretly hates her though he plays on her insecurities to secure his position.

During the fight between the Red Queen's army and the White Queen's, the Knave of Hearts fights against the Mad Hatter. After the Jabberwocky is slain by Alice, Stayne is also exiled to Outland with the Red Queen. He tries to kill the Red Queen only to be thwarted by Mad Hatter. As both of them are dragged to their exile, the Red Queen shouted "He tried to kill me" while the Knave of Hearts begged the White Queen to kill him.

He is also a major villain in the video game adaptation of the film and the second boss.

In the sequel Alice Through the Looking Glass, the Knave's skeleton is seen implying that he got his wish to die. At one point, a weakened Time asked the Knave's skeleton what the Red Queen did to him.

=== Once Upon a Time ===
- The Knave of Hearts appears in two episodes of Once Upon a Time: the season one episode "Hat Trick" and the season two episode "Queen of Hearts" where he is played by Paul McGillion. He takes the White Rabbit's place as the herald of the Queen of Hearts, who to mask her identity communicates with him by whispering through a horn.
- An earlier Knave of Hearts appears in the show's spin-off Once Upon a Time in Wonderland where he is played by Michael Socha. This interpretation of the Knave was taken by the Evil Queen's curse to Storybrooke, Maine. At some point after the curse on the town is broken, the White Rabbit takes him to rescue Alice. His heart was previously removed by Cora (the Queen of Hearts, also the miller's daughter from Rumpelstiltskin and the mother of the Evil Queen) and was retrieved by Alice during her earlier adventures in Wonderland. The Knave of Hearts is also revealed to be Will Scarlet, who absconded to Wonderland with a woman named Anastasia who became the Red Queen.

=== Television ===
- In Syfy's original miniseries Alice, the Knave, played by Philip Winchester, is reimagined as Jack Heart (playing on the fact that "knaves" are now called "jacks"), the son of Mary Elizabeth Heart, a reimagining of both the Queen of Hearts and the Red Queen. Jack is the heir to the throne of Wonderland, but escaped to the "real" world to avoid marrying the Duchess. He eventually fell in love with his martial arts instructor, Alice, and was kidnapped by Agent White of the White Rabbits, prompting Alice to enter Wonderland to find him.
- In the anime and manga series Pandora Hearts, the knave is reimagined as Jack Vessalius. A character who while initially presented as a hero; was later revealed to be the mastermind behind the majority of the conflict in the story including Alice's murder due to his insane love for Lacie who was based on the Red Queen to be reunited. This was foreshadowed by the fact that the word "knave" means an untrustworthy person it also means male servant referencing his loyalty for Lacie.

=== Ballet ===
- The Knave has a prominent role in Christopher Wheeldon's Alice's Adventures in Wonderland, where he is Alice's love interest. The dancer portraying the Knave also portrays the character of Jack, the gardener's boy who is Alice's friend in the real world. The role was originated by Sergei Polunin at the World Premiere at The Royal Ballet.
