= Alice (miniseries) =

- Title Card
- Genre: Science fiction Fantasy; Romance
- Created by: Nick Willing
- Written by: Nick Willing
- Directed by: Nick Willing
- Starring: Caterina Scorsone; Kathy Bates; Andrew-Lee Potts; Matt Frewer; Harry Dean Stanton; Colm Meaney; Tim Curry; Philip Winchester
- Theme music composer: Ben Mink
- Countries of origin: Canada; United States
- Original language: English
- No. of episodes: 2

Production
- Producer: Michael O'Connor
- Editors: Allan Lee; Peter Forslund
- Running time: 180 minutes
- Production companies: Reunion Pictures; Alice Productions; Studio Eight Productions; RHI Entertainment

Original release
- Network: Showcase
- Release: December 6 – December 7, 2009

Alice is a 2009 television miniseries that was originally broadcast on Canadian cable television channel Showcase and an hour later on American cable television channel Syfy. The miniseries is a reimagining of the classic Lewis Carroll novels Alice's Adventures in Wonderland (1865) and Through the Looking-Glass (1871), taking place about 150 years later with science fiction and additional fantasy elements added. The miniseries, produced by Reunion Pictures is three hours long, split into two parts, which premiered on Sunday, December 6, 2009, and Monday, December 7, 2009, respectively. Writer and director Nick Willing previously directed a 1999 adaptation of the books that followed the story more closely; however, Alice is intended to be a modern interpretation, imagining how Wonderland might have evolved over the last 143 years. The mini-series was partially shot in the Kamloops, British Columbia, Canada.

== Plot ==
Alice Hamilton is a judo sensei living with her mother Carol. Her father disappeared when she was ten, and she has spent much of her life looking for him. She invites her new boyfriend Jack Chase to dinner, but is shocked when he gives her a valuable-looking ring as a gift. Jack abruptly leaves, Alice following only to witness Jack being abducted by several men. A man (the White Rabbit) appears and finds out that Alice is in possession of the ring because he hears the click of the mechanical box that contains the ring opening behind her back. He manages to take the box from her, thinking the ring is still in it, but Alice had already quickly taken it out and resealed the box. The White Rabbit runs away and Alice chases him to find out where they had taken Jack, but falls through a giant looking glass and lands in Wonderland, which has evolved over the past 150 years. Mary Heart, the Queen of Hearts rules over Wonderland from the Happy Hearts Casino, where people from Alice's world ("Oysters") are taken to, sedated and play games in the casino, their positive emotions drained from them and turned into drug-like substances for the people of Wonderland to digest, keeping them under the Queen's control.

Alice escapes her own capture, with the ring still in her possession. Identified as an "Oyster" by the tattoo she gains, Alice is taken to Hatter, a member of the resistance seeking to free the Oysters from the Queen's control. Hatter takes Alice to ask Dodo to help save Jack, but Dodo refuses, until the Hatter reveals the ring Alice wears, which Dodo recognizes as the Stone of Wonderland, able to open the Looking Glass back to the human world. Alice flees when Dodo tries to kill her, Hatter accompanying her to the forest where they escape a jabberwock and meet Charlie, a surviving White Knight, who fled a battle years ago where Wonderland's knights were wiped out by the Queen. The Queen has the White Rabbit executed, and has the Walrus and Carpenter revive Mad March, her favorite assassin to track Alice.

Alice deliberately allows Mad March to capture her, so she can negotiate with the Queen to free Jack in return for the ring, which Alice has hidden. Jack appears, revealed as the Queen's son and to already be engaged to the Duchess. However, Jack passes Alice her father's watch, implying he is alive and in Wonderland. Alice is put in the Truth Room, where Tweedledum and Tweedledee interrogate her to learn the ring's location, but she is freed by Hatter and Charlie, the trio escaping back to the forests, whilst Jack also escapes. In hopes of aiding the resistance and returning Alice home, Hatter uses his connections to find someone who can bring them to Caterpillar, leader of the resistance, using the ring as leverage. To their surprise, the agent who arrives is Jack, revealing him as an agent of the resistance who had originally stolen the ring as part of a ploy to initiate a coup to overthrow the queen. Trusting him, Alice retrieves the ring, and accompanies Jack to meet Caterpillar, who reveals that Alice's father is Carpenter, but he has no memory of her. As the Carpenter has been crucial in process for extracting emotions for the Queen, Jack had deliberately approached Alice in hopes that she could help the Carpenter break away from the Queen's control. Just as the Carpenter shows signs of regaining memories, Mad March and his minions arrive, capturing Alice and Jack whilst Caterpillar escapes.

Reunited with her ring, the Queen decides to send Alice home and execute Jack. Hatter stages a rescue with Charlie but is captured by Mad March after Charlie loses his courage and flees. Charlie, after feeling guilty for deserting Hatter, uses the skeletons of the extinct White Knights as a distraction to trick the Hearts into believing they are under attack. After being tortured by Dr. Dum and Dee, Hatter kills Mad March and escapes. Alice escapes again, joining up with the Hatter to snap the Oysters out of their sedations and rally them to escape. Carpenter appears, having regained his memories, but is killed by Walrus. The Oysters' unpleasant emotions run high, causing the casino to start collapsing. Alice, Hatter, Jack, the Duchess and the Queen escape but Winston, the loyal King of Hearts willingly perishes knowing his wife never loved him. With her followers no longer listening to or fearing her, the powerless Queen surrenders the Stone of Wonderland to Alice. Alice returns home, learning her experience may have been a dream when she awakens in hospital to find she had been found unconscious an hour after chasing Jack. However, the next day she discovers the "construction worker" who found her was Hatter. The two share a passionate kiss in front of a looking glass, as Carol stares in shock.

== Cast ==
- Caterina Scorsone as Alice Hamilton
- Andrew-Lee Potts as Hatter
- Matt Frewer as Charlie the White Knight
- Kathy Bates as Mary Heart the Queen of Hearts
- Philip Winchester as Jack Heart the Prince of Hearts/Jack Chase
- Colm Meaney as Winston Heart the King of Hearts
- Tim Curry as Dodo
- Harry Dean Stanton as Caterpillar
- Timothy Webber as Robert Hamilton/Carpenter
- Zak Santiago as 10 of Clubs
- Charlotte Sullivan as Duchess
- Alan Gray as the White Rabbit
- Eugene Lipinski as Doctors Dee and Dum
- Nancy Robertson as Dormouse
- Tom Heaton as Duck
- Eileen Barrett as Owl
- Alek Diakun as Rat Catcher
- Dave Ward as Walrus
- Alessandro Juliani as 9 of Clubs
- Teryl Rothery as Carol Hamilton
- Geoff Redknap as Mad March
- Natasha Calis as Looking Glass Girl

== Reception ==
Paige Wiser of the Chicago Sun-Times gave the show three of five stars, saying that it was "charming, but not perfect." Randee Dawn from The Hollywood Reporter also gave the program a mediocre review, and Nancy deWolf Smith of The Wall Street Journal said that "despite...diversions and whiz-bang special effects, [Alice] drags at times."

Mark A. Perigard of the Boston Herald called Alice "fresh and original," lauding the acting and story. TV.com also praised the show, calling it "a champion of production that fuses modern invention and nostalgic resourcefulness", and David Hinckley of New York Daily News called it "just plain wonderful," saying that it was "a vehicle to engage the imagination while it amuses and entertains."

Steven James Snyder of Techland.com said: "There's no denying that Alice has put it all on the line. And even when it comes to those who may not think that the whole thing gels perfectly, Alice's unhinged creativity is bound to at least earn their respect." Rick Bentley at The Fresno Bee said: "The result will have you smiling like a Cheshire Cat. Willing creates a world that's Minority Report meets Austin Powers. The real fun is seeing how cleverly Willing has updated the familiar story to make it different from past TV and film versions."

However, Tom Shales from The Washington Post'' gave the program a very negative review, saying that Tin Man was far superior, while IGN said that Alice was "long-winded, uninspiring, and...hardly [did] the original material justice." Robert Bianco from USA Today gave the show an indifferent review, calling it superior to Tin Man but saying the plot was "superimposed...with its shifting motives and dreary lectures," ultimately giving it two and a half stars out of four.

== Blu-ray and DVD ==
Alice was released on DVD and Blu-ray on March 2, 2010.
