= White Knight (Through the Looking-Glass) =

Fictional character in "Through the Looking-Glass" by Lewis Carroll

- Alice character
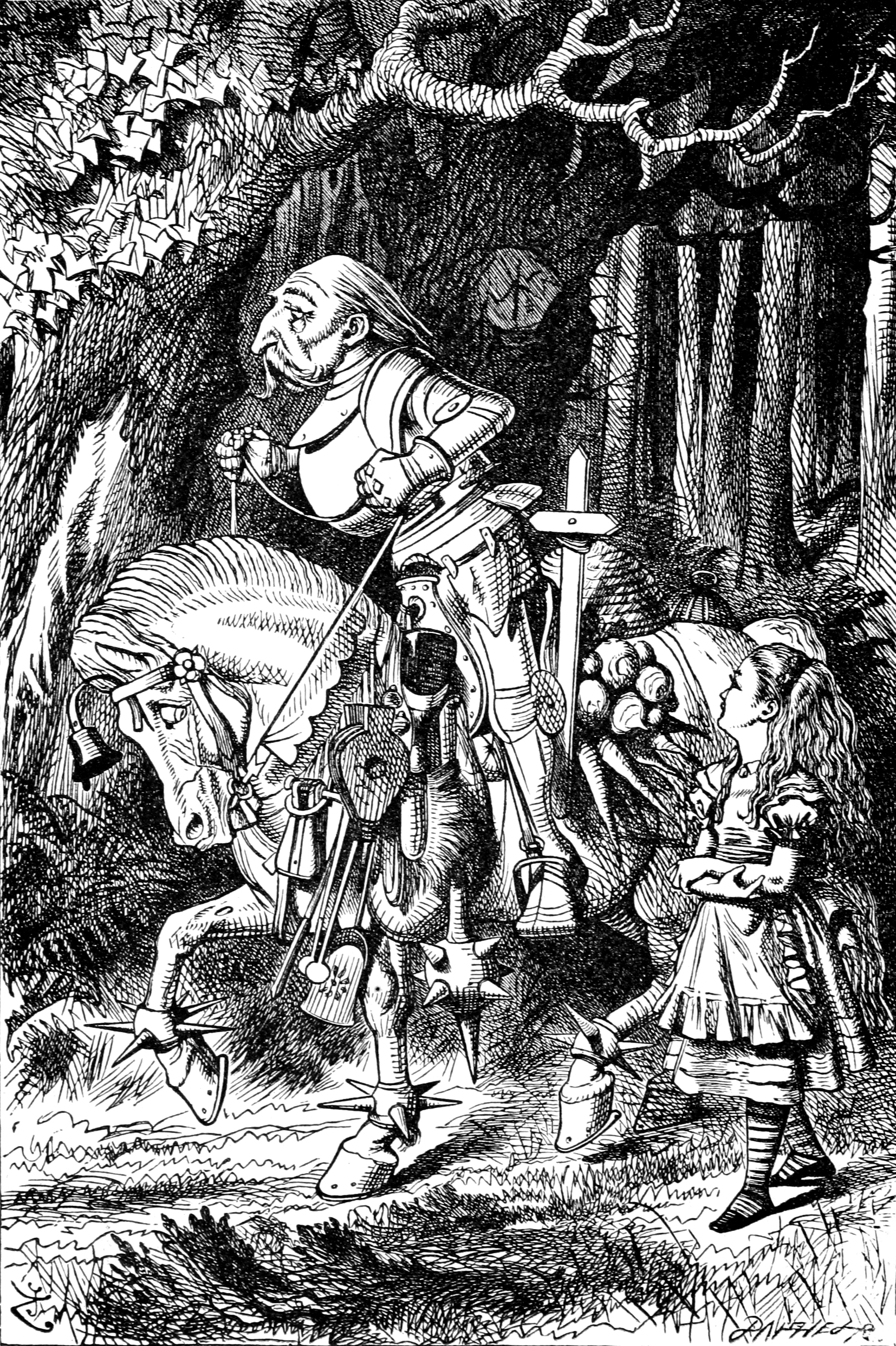
- 1871 illustration by John Tenniel
- First appearance: Through the Looking-Glass
- Created by: Lewis Carroll

In-universe information
- Species: Human
- Gender: Male
- Occupation: Knight
- Nationality: Looking-Glass Land

The White Knight is a fictional character in Lewis Carroll's 1871 book Through the Looking-Glass. He represents the chess piece of the same name. As imagined in John Tenniel's illustrations for the Alice stories, he is inspired by Albrecht Dürer's 1513 engraving "Knight, Death and the Devil."

== Storyline ==
The White Knight saves Alice from his opponent (the Red Knight). He repeatedly falls off his horse and lands on his head, and tells Alice of his inventions, which consists of things such as a pudding with ingredients like blotting paper, an upside down container, and anklets to guard his horse against shark bites. He recites a poem of his own composition, 'A-Sitting on a Gate', (but the song's name is called 'Haddocks' Eyes') and he and Alice depart.

== Film incarnations ==
- Alice In Wonderland (1933) Played by Gary Cooper
- The White Knight was planned to appear in Disney's 1951 movie, but the idea got scrapped. Alice had to meet him at the Tulgey Wood, where the White Knight (supposed to be a caricature of Walt Disney himself) tried to lift her spirit up after the girl gets lost. Few concept art pictures of the White Knight survive.
- Alice in Wonderland (1955) (TV) Played by Reginald Gardiner
- Alice in Wonderland (or What's a Nice Kid Like You Doing in a Place Like This?) (1966) (TV) Played by Bill Dana
- Alice Through the Looking Glass (1974) (TV) Played by Geoffrey Bayldon
- Alisa v Zazerkalie ("Alice through the Looking-Glass") (1982) (Soviet cartoon) Voiced by Nikolai Karachentsov
- Alice in Wonderland 1982 (TV) Played by Stephen Boe
- Great Performances: "Alice in Wonderland" (1983) TV episode, Played by Richard Burton
- Alice in Wonderland (1985) (TV) Played by Lloyd Bridges
- Alice Through the Looking Glass (1987) (TV) Played by Alan Young
- Chess Wars (1996) Played by Kirk B.R. Woller
- Alice Through the Looking Glass (1998) (TV) Played by Ian Holm
- Alice Underground (1999) Played by Chris Danuser
- Alice in Wonderland (1999) (TV) Played by Christopher Lloyd
- The Slick White Rabbit (2005) Played by Steve Furedy
- Alice (2009) (TV) Played by Matt Frewer
- In the 2010 movie, the White Knight is one of the White Queen's soldiers. He looks almost exactly like the real chess piece where he has the head of a horse.
