= Dodo (Alice's Adventures in Wonderland) =

Fictional character created by Lewis Carroll

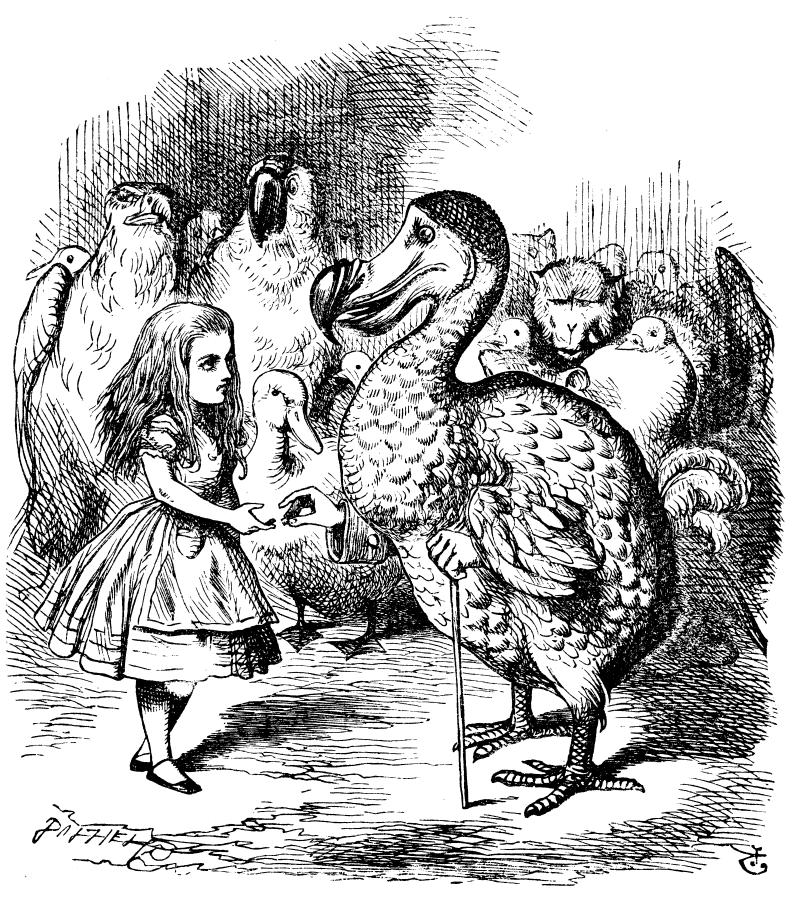
- John Tenniel's illustration of the Dodo in "A Caucus Race and a Long Tale". An illustration from Alice's Adventures in Wonderland.
- First appearance: Alice's Adventures in Wonderland
- Created by: Lewis Carroll

In-universe information
- Species: Dodo
- Gender: Male
- Occupation: Bird

The Dodo is a fictional character appearing in Chapters 2 and 3 of the 1865 book Alice's Adventures in Wonderland by Lewis Carroll (Charles Lutwidge Dodgson). The Dodo is a caricature of the author. A popular but unsubstantiated belief is that Dodgson chose the particular animal to represent himself because of his stammer, and thus would accidentally introduce himself as "Do-do-dodgson".

Historically, the dodo was a flightless bird that lived on the island of Mauritius, east of Madagascar in the Indian Ocean. It became extinct in the mid 17th century during the colonisation of the island by the Dutch.

== Alice's Adventures in Wonderland ==
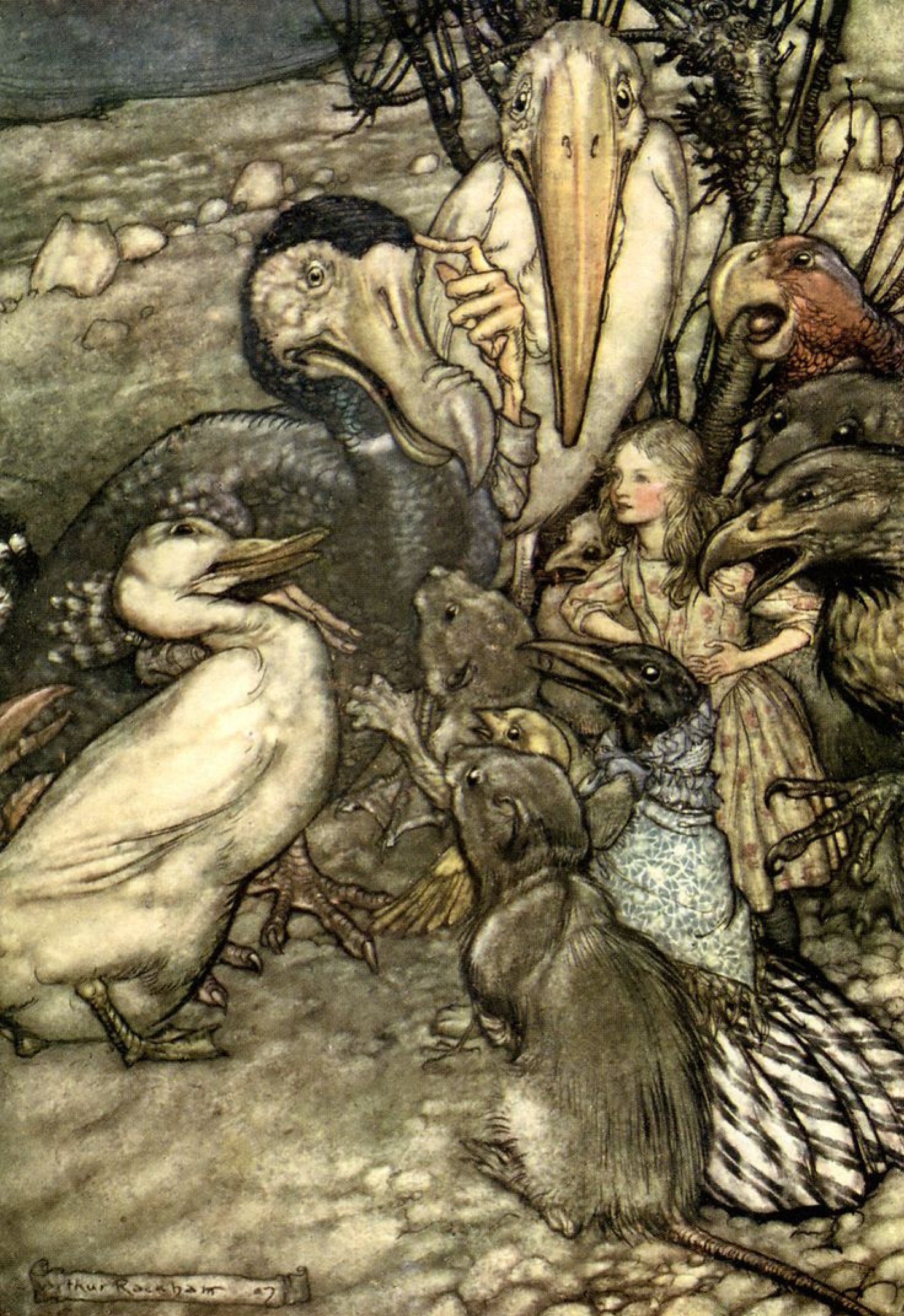
Depiction by Arthur Rackham, 1907

In this passage Lewis Carroll incorporated references to the original boating expedition of 4 July 1862 during which Alice's Adventures were first told, with Alice as herself, and the others represented by birds: the Lory was Lorina Liddell, the Eaglet was Edith Liddell, the Dodo was Dodgson, and the Duck was Rev. Robinson Duckworth. In order to get dry after a swim, the Dodo proposes that everyone run a Caucus race – where the participants run in patterns of any shape, starting and leaving off whenever they like, so that everyone wins. At the end of the race, Alice distributes comfits from her pocket to all as prizes. However this leaves no prize for herself. The Dodo inquires what else she has in her pocket. As she has only a thimble, the Dodo requests it from her and then awards it to Alice as her prize. The Caucus Race, as depicted by Carroll, is a satire on the political caucus system, mocking its lack of clarity and decisiveness.

== Interpretations ==
=== Disney animated film version ===
Dodo
- First appearance: Alice in Wonderland (1951)
- Voiced by: Bill Thompson

In-universe information
- Nickname: Dodo
- Species: Dodo
- Gender: Male
- Occupation: Sailor; Captain

In the Disney film, the Dodo plays a much greater role in the story than in the book. He is merged with the character of Pat the Gardener, which leads to him sometimes being nicknamed Pat the Dodo, but this name is never mentioned in the film. The Dodo is also the leader of the Caucus Race. He has the appearance and personality of a sea captain. The Dodo is voiced by Bill Thompson and animated by Milt Kahl.

Dodo is first seen as Alice is floating on the sea in a bottle. Dodo is seen singing, but when Alice asks him for help, he does not notice her. On shore, Dodo is seen on a rock, organizing a caucus race. This race involves running around until one gets dry, but the attempts are hampered by incoming waves.

Dodo is later summoned by the White Rabbit, when the rabbit believes a monster, actually Alice having magically grown to a giant size, is inside his home. Dodo brings Bill the Lizard, and attempts to get him to go down the chimney. Bill refuses at first, but Dodo is able to convince him otherwise. However, the soot causes Alice to sneeze, sending Bill high up into the sky. Dodo then decides to burn the house down, much to the chagrin of the White Rabbit. He begins gathering wood, such as the furniture, for this purpose. However, Alice is soon able to return to a smaller size and exit the house by eating a carrot from the White Rabbit's garden.

The White Rabbit soon leaves, while Dodo asks for matches, not realizing that the situation has been resolved. He then asks Alice for a match, but when she doesn't have any, Dodo complains about the lack of cooperation and uses his pipe to light the fire.

The Dodo later appears briefly at the end of the film, conducting another Caucus Race while Alice is being chased by the Queen of Hearts and her card soldiers.

==== Other appearances ====
Like other Disney animated characters, he has cameo appearances in the television series House of Mouse.

In the television series Alice's Wonderland Bakery, appears Captain Dodo (voiced by Rich Sommer), being unknown if he is the same character from the film, or a descendant as is the case of other characters from Wonderland in the series (the plot placed several decades after the events in the film). Captain Dodo also has a daughter named Jojo.

=== 1988 animated film version ===
Dodo
- First appearance: Alice in Wonderland (1988)
- Voiced by: Keith Scott

In-universe information
- Species: Dodo
- Gender: Male

The Dodo, voiced by Keith Scott, is the last to arrive at the shore of the Sea of Tears and suggests they have the Caucus race, indicating their position to everyone. He often mentions that "he is extinct," because Alice had previously stated her belief that Dodos were extinct.

After the croquet match, the Cheshire Cat takes Alice to the Dodo after learning the location of the beautiful garden. Later, the Dodo leads her to the Mock Turtle, with the Dodo taking the place of the Gryphon in the story.

=== Tim Burton's version ===
Uilleam
- First appearance: Alice in Wonderland (2010)
- Voiced by: Michael Gough

In-universe information
- Species: Dodo
- Gender: Male
- Occupation: Adviser; Caddy

In Tim Burton's adaptation of Alice in Wonderland, the Dodo's appearance retains the subtle apparent nature from John Tenniel's illustration. He bears a down of brilliant blue and wears a navy blue waistcoat and white spats along with glasses and a cane. He is one of Alice's good-willed advisers, taking first note of her abilities as the true Alice. He is also one of the oldest inhabitants. His name is Uilleam, and he is portrayed by Michael Gough. He goes with the White Rabbit, Tweedledum and Tweedledee, and Dormouse to take Alice to Caterpillar to decide whether Alice is the real one. He is later captured by the Red Queen's forces. When Alice came to the Red Queen's castle, he was seen at the Red Queen's castle yard as a caddy for the Queen's croquet game. After the Red Queen orders the release of the Jubjub bird to kill all her subjects from rebelling, he is then seen briefly running from it when the Tweedles went to hide from it and escaped but was snatched by the Jubjub and was never seen again throughout the film.

His name may be based on a lecture on William the Conqueror from Chapter Three of the original novel. The character is voiced by Michael Gough in his final feature film role before his death in 2011. Gough came out of retirement to appear in the film but the character only speaks three lines, so Gough managed to record in one day.

=== Other media ===
- In the 1933 film Alice in Wonderland, the Dodo is portrayed by Polly Moran.
- In the 1983 Broadway stage performance for television Alice in Wonderland, the Dodo is portrayed by Frantz Hall.
- In the 1983 anime television series Fushigi no Kuni no Alice, the Dodo is shown as and elderly and eccentric character who has shown to have dabbled in magic.
- In the 1999 television film Alice in Wonderland, Peter Bayliss portrays Mr Dodo. Like the rest of the participants in the caucus race, in this adaptation he has the appearance of a human with animal features.
- In the 2009 miniseries Alice, the character is a human nicknamed "Dodo", portrayed by Tim Curry. Hatter takes Alice to ask him to help save Jack, but Dodo refuses. After it, the Hatter reveals the ring Alice wears, which Dodo recognizes as the Stone of Wonderland, able to open the Looking Glass back to the human world, so he tries to kill her, causing Alice to flee.
- The Dodo is voiced by Simon Day in the 2024 animated movie The Night Before Christmas in Wonderland.
- In the 2025 Russian musical film Alice in Wonderland, the Dodo is portrayed by Oleg Savostyuk.
- The Dodo is played by Julia Davies in the 2026 movie The Man with the Plan.
