= Mouse (Alice's Adventures in Wonderland) =

Fictional character in Lewis Carroll's 1865 novel

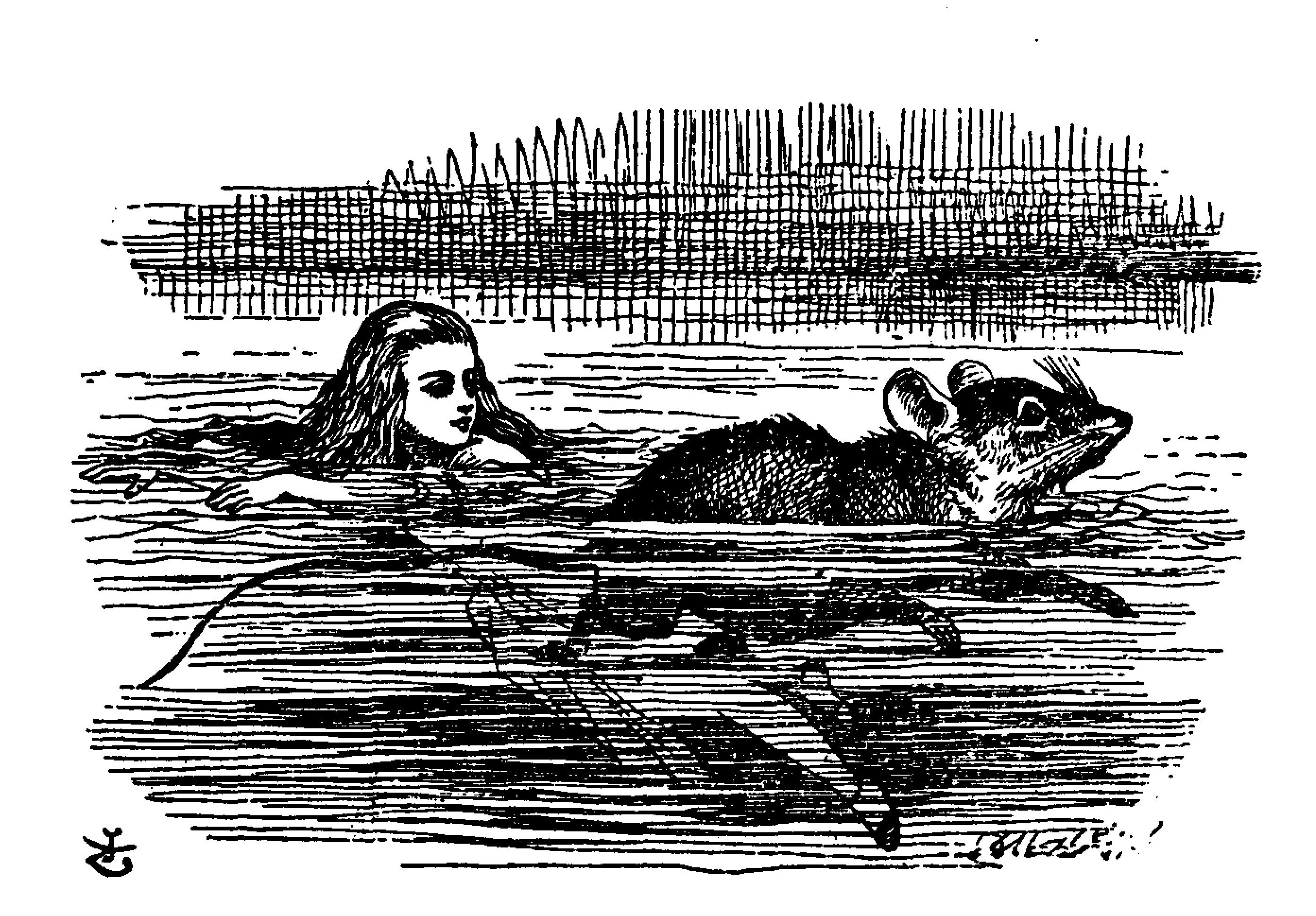
- John Tenniel's illustration of the Mouse in "The Pool of Tears". An illustration from Alice in Wonderland.
- First appearance: Alice's Adventures in Wonderland
- Created by: Lewis Carroll

In-universe information
- Species: Mouse
- Gender: Male

The Mouse is a fictional character in Lewis Carroll's 1865 novel Alice's Adventures in Wonderland. He appears in Chapter II "The Pool of Tears" and Chapter III "A Caucus-Race and a Long Tale" .

Alice, the eponymous heroine in the book, first talks to the mouse when she is floating in a pool of her own tears, having shrunk in size:

`O Mouse, do you know the way out of this pool? I am very tired of swimming about here, O Mouse!' (Alice thought this must be the right way of speaking to a mouse: she had never done such a thing before, but she remembered having seen in her brother's Latin Grammar, `A mouse—of a mouse—to a mouse—a mouse—O mouse!' The Mouse looked at her rather inquisitively, and seemed to her to wink with one of its little eyes, but it said nothing.

With no response from the mouse, Alice fears that it may not speak English and attempts to speak French. Upon mentioning the French word for cat, chatte, the mouse panics. This leads to a discussion about cats and dogs, culminating in the mouse telling Alice his history.

== The Mouse's Tale ==
When Alice hears the mouse's "long and sad tale", she is watching his tail. So, she imagines the tale in its shape. The "Fury" referenced in the tale is Carroll's childhood friend's dog.

The Mouse's Tale, as printed in the first edition

The Mouse's Tale from Alice's Adventures Under Ground, Carroll's original 1864 manuscript

                    Fury said to a 
                  mouse, That he
                met in the
              house, 
           "Let us
             both go to
               law:  I will
                 prosecute
                    YOU.  --Come,
                       I'll take no
                        denial; We
                     must have a
                 trial:  For
              really this
           morning I've
          nothing
         to do."
           Said the
             mouse to the
               cur, "Such
                 a trial,
                   dear Sir,
                         With
                     no jury
                  or judge,
                would be
              wasting
             our
              breath."
               "I'll be
                 judge, I'll
                   be jury,"
                    Said
                     cunning
                      old Fury:
                     "I'll
                      try the
                         whole
                          cause,
                             and
                        condemn
                       you
                      to
                       death."'

== In other media ==
Although the Mouse does not appear in the 1951 Disney film, part of his personality has been integrated to the Dormouse.

The character makes an appearance in the 1985 made-for-TV adaptation of Alice in Wonderland and is portrayed by Sherman Hemsley. In this incarnation the Mouse sings "I Hate Dogs and Cats" before joining in the Caucus-race with the rest of the animals that have been floating on Alice's pool of tears.

In the 1983 anime Fushigi no Kuni no Alice, The Mouse appears in overalls. Though he dislikes cats, he isn't actually scared of them.

In Jan Švankmajer's 1988 film adaptation, The Mouse swims up to Alice and climbs atop her head. Seemingly unaware that Alice is alive, he sets up camp, driving stakes into Alice's head to support his cooking pot. Alice tolerates this, but when the Mouse sets a fire to begin cooking, Alice proclaims he has gone "too far" and submerges her head under the water, to the Mouse's surprise and dismay.

In the anime and manga series Pandora Hearts The Mouse is reimagined as Gilbert Nightray with his fear of cats and his younger brother Vincent is based on the Dormouse.

The character also makes an appearance as Mr. Mouse in the 1999 made-for-TV Hallmark adaption and is portrayed by Ken Dodd.

In the 2025 Russian musical film Alice in Wonderland, the Mouse is female and is portrayed by Polina Guchman.
