= Florida Friebus =

American actress (1909–88)

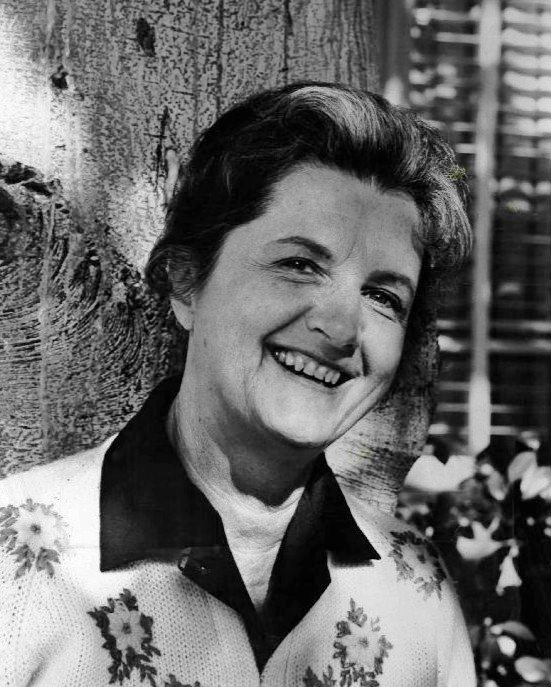
- Friebus in 1968
- Born: October 10, 1909; Auburndale, Massachusetts, U.S.
- Died: May 27, 1988 (aged 78); Laguna Niguel, California, U.S.
- Other names: Florida Freebus; Florida Freibus
- Occupations: Actress, screenwriter
- Years active: 1929–1978
- Spouse: Richard Waring (m. 1934; div. 1952)
- Children: 1

Florida Friebus (October 10, 1909 (Note: Her obituary in the Los Angeles Times gives her birth year as 1908.) – May 27, 1988) was an American writer and actress of stage, film, and television. Friebus's best-known roles were Winifred "Winnie" Gillis, the sympathetic mother of Dwayne Hickman's character Dobie Gillis on The Many Loves of Dobie Gillis, and Mrs. Lillian Bakerman on The Bob Newhart Show. She is known for her 1932 adaptation of Alice and Wonderland.

== Early years ==
Florida Friebus was born in Auburndale, Massachusetts, to Theodore Friebus and Beatrice Flagg Mosier Friebus. (Note: Her obituary in the Los Angeles Times gives her place of birth as Nantucket Island, Massachusetts.) She was known to make it clear to curious people that she was named after her mother's favorite aunt—not after the state of Florida. Her paternal grandmother was named Florida as well.

== Personal life ==
Friebus married actor Richard Waring in 1934. They had one child who died in infancy. The couple divorced in 1952. Friebus never remarried. She died in May, 1988.

== Career ==
Friebus first acted professionally in 1929 in New York City, appearing in The Cradle Song with the Civic Repertory Theater. On Broadway she starred as Maggie Wallace in The Primrose Path (1939).

She appeared on television in such programs as The Ford Theatre Hour, Perry Mason, Bachelor Father, Father Knows Best, The Rookies, Peyton Place, Ironside, Gunsmoke, Sanford and Son, Ben Casey, The Doris Day Show, The Mary Tyler Moore Show, Room 222, The Partridge Family, Chico and the Man, Barnaby Jones, Alice, and Rhoda.

She also read stories to children on Look and Listen on KNXT in Los Angeles, California.

As a writer, Friebus collaborated with Eva Le Gallienne to dramatize Alice in Wonderland. The adaptation by Le Gallienne and Friebus was presented on Broadway and later on the Hallmark Hall of Fame on television.

== Actors' Equity ==
Friebus spent more than 16 years on the board of Actors' Equity Association. She was presented the Phil Loeb Award "for extraordinary service to her profession."

== Papers ==
Friebus's papers are housed at the New York Public Library.

== Filmography ==
Film
Year	Film	Role	Notes
1958	High School Confidential!	Mrs. Staples	Uncredited
1978	Jennifer	Miss Tooker	
Television
Year	Title	Role	Notes
1950	Lights Out		1 episode
1950	Escape		1 episode
1950	Pulitzer Prize Playhouse		1 episode
1950–1951	The Philco Television Playhouse		2 episodes
1950–1953	Kraft Television Theatre		3 episodes
1953	Goodyear Television Playhouse		1 episode
1954	Lamp Unto My Feet		1 episode
1956	Hallmark Hall of Fame	Karoline	1 episode
1956	The Alcoa Hour	Mrs. Franklin	1 episode
1957	The Joseph Cotten Show	Helen Fogarty	1 episode
1957–1958	Bachelor Father	Mrs. Banks; Mrs. Marquand	3 episodes
1958	Father Knows Best		1 episode
1958	Gunsmoke	Mrs. Meggs	1 episode
1959	Playhouse 90		1 episode
1959	The Donna Reed Show	Helen Brooks	1 episode
1959–1963	The Many Loves of Dobie Gillis	Winifred Gillis	87 episodes
1960	The Chevy Mystery Show	Lois Halsey	1 episode
1963	Perry Mason	Marian Lamont	1 episode
1964	The New Phil Silvers Show	Mrs. Bradshaw	1 episode
1964	Peyton Place	Maggie Riggs	Unknown episodes
1965	My Mother the Car	Miss McFee	1 episode
1966	This Is the Life		1 episode
1966	Ben Casey		1 episode
1968	Ironside	Middle-Aged Woman	1 episode
1971–1972	The Mary Tyler Moore Show	Mrs. Marshall; Nun	2 episodes
1972	Sanford and Son	Woman	1 episode
1972	Ghost Story	Mrs. Prescott	1 episode
1972	The Doris Day Show	Miss Peabody	1 episode
1972	Owen Marshall, Counselor at Law		1 episode
1972–1978	The Bob Newhart Show	Mrs. Lillian Bakerman	17 episodes
1973	Room 222		1 episode
1973	Cannon	Julie McElroy	1 episode
1973	Gunsmoke	Mrs. Tavers	1 episode
1973	The Partridge Family	Mrs. Hendleman	1 episode
1973	The Rookies	Sister Elizabeth	1 episode
1973–1977	Barnaby Jones	Molly McMurty; Connie Graham	2 episodes
1974–1978	Rhoda	Harriet Strongen; Edna Brundidge; Mrs. Swensen	3 episodes
1975	Chico and the Man	Althea Nelson	1 episode
1975	Miles to Go Before I Sleep	Ruth	Television movie
1975	Love Nest	Jenny	1 episode
1975	Kate McShane		1 episode
1976	Amelia Earhart	Miss Perkins	Television movie
1976	Switch	Fiona	2 episodes
1978	Kaz		1 episode
1978	ABC Weekend Special	Miss Kelly	1 episode
