= Eva Le Gallienne =

American actress and author (1899–1991)

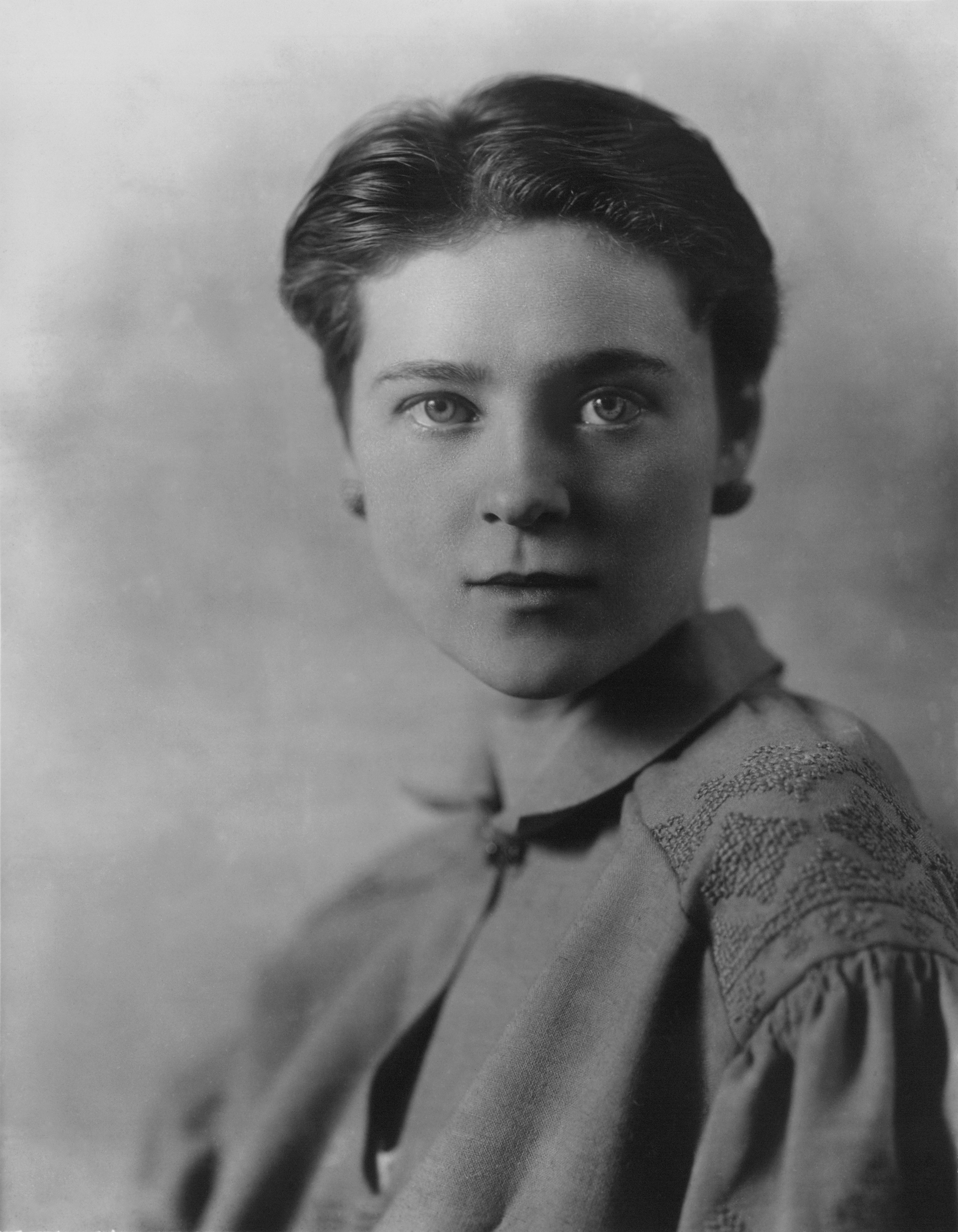
- c. 1923–1928
- Born: January 11, 1899; London, England
- Died: June 3, 1991 (aged 92); Weston, Connecticut, U.S.
- Occupations: Actress; producer; director; translator; author
- Years active: 1914–1984
- Partner(s): Mary "Mimsey" Benson (née Duggett); Mercedes de Acosta; Josephine Hutchinson; Marion Gunnar Evensen-Westlake; Margaret Webster
- Parents: Richard Le Gallienne, writer (father); Julie Norregaard Le Gallienne, journalist, writer (mother)
- Relatives: Gwen Le Gallienne (step-sister)

Eva Le Gallienne (January 11, 1899 – June 3, 1991) was an English-born American stage actress, producer, director, translator, and author. A Broadway star by age 21, in 1926 she left Broadway behind to found the Civic Repertory Theatre, where she served as director, producer, and lead actress. Noted for her boldness and idealism, she was a pioneering figure in the American theater, setting the stage for the Off-Broadway and regional theater movements that swept the country later in the 20th century. She had significant success with her stage adaptation of Alice in Wonderland which was staged multiple times on Broadway.

Le Gallienne devoted herself to the art of the theater as opposed to the show business of Broadway. She felt strongly that high-quality plays should be affordable and accessible to all people who wanted to see them. She ran the Civic Repertory Theatre for seven years (1926–1934), producing 37 plays during that time with a company whose actors included Burgess Meredith, John Garfield, Norman Lloyd, J. Edward Bromberg, Paul Leyssac, Florida Friebus, David Manners, Josephine Hutchinson, Alla Nazimova, Joseph Schildkraut, and Leona Roberts.

== Life and career ==
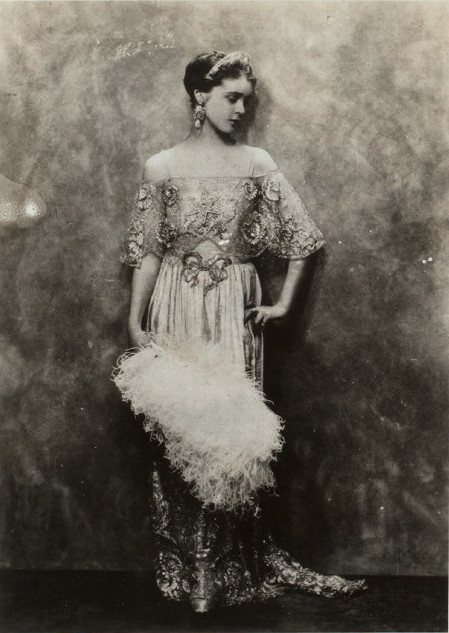
Eva Le Gallienne, c. 1920s

Le Gallienne was born in London to Richard Le Gallienne, an English poet of French descent, and Julie Nørregaard, a Danish journalist. They married in 1897 and separated in 1903, later divorcing. Le Gallienne and her mother spent the next eleven years shuttling between Paris, London, and Copenhagen.

While in Paris, Le Gallienne was taken to see performances by Sarah Bernhardt. She idolized the actress and sought to emulate her. Meeting "La Grande Sarah" as a young girl inspired Le Gallienne to devote herself to "the power of the Theatre to spread beauty out into life."

Le Gallienne made her stage debut at the age of 15 with a walk-on role in a 1914 production of Maurice Maeterlinck's Monna Vanna. She spent several months attending drama school at Tree's Academy (now the Royal Academy of Dramatic Art). She left school to perform in the role of a cockney servant in a West End play called The Laughter of Fools, and "brought down the house", receiving excellent reviews.

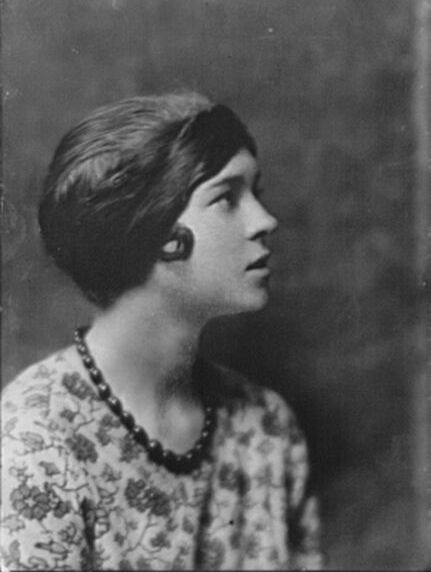
Le Gallienne, 1916 or later (by Genthe)

The next year, at age 16, Le Gallienne and her mother sailed for New York City, where she began auditioning for Broadway plays. Her first few roles were small, and she struggled for recognition. She spent a season performing on tour and in summer stock. After traveling in Europe for a period of time, she returned to New York to star in Arthur Richman's Not So Long Ago (1920).

Soon afterward, she became a full-fledged Broadway sensation playing the role of Julie in Ferenc Molnár's Liliom (1921) for the Theatre Guild. She became known as a star in 1923 when she played Princess Alexandra in Molnar's The Swan. Le Gallienne became a naturalized United States citizen in 1927.

Le Gallienne's great dream was to found a classical repertory theatre like those of the European cities in which she grew up. After producing and directing some special matinees of plays by Henrik Ibsen, in 1926 she leased a theatre on West Fourteenth Street in Manhattan. There she established the Civic Repertory Theatre. Her goal was to present the highest quality plays at the lowest possible prices. Her motto was, "The theatre should be an instrument for giving, not a machinery for getting."

She ran the non-profit Civic Repertory Theatre for seven years (1926–1934), backed by the financial support of Alice DeLamar, a wealthy heiress, as well as several other prominent donors who believed in her work and agreed to subsidize it. The Civic Rep disbanded at the height of the Depression in 1934, having lost numerous subscriptions and subsidies due to the economic downturn.

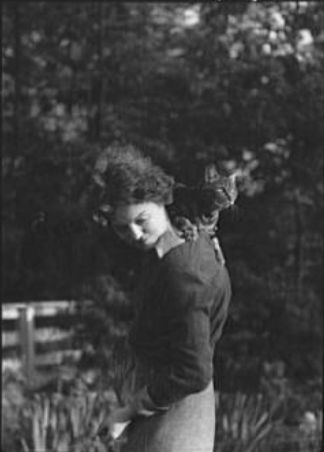
Le Gallienne with cat, 1937 (Genthe)

Le Gallienne was a lesbian; she was as open about her love of women as it was possible to be in her day. Robert Schanke, who published a biography of Le Gallienne in 1992, claimed that she struggled with her sexual orientation throughout her life. But, such assertions are contradicted by Le Gallienne's own letters and diaries, in which she wrote confidently about her romantic relationships with women.

Helen Sheehy, who published an authorized biography in 1996 with the cooperation of Le Gallienne's estate, rejected Schanke's portrait of the actress as a self-hating lesbian. Sheehy quotes Le Gallienne's words of advice to her close friend and poet May Sarton, who was also homosexual: "People hate what they don't understand and try to destroy it. Only try to keep yourself clear and don't allow that destructive force to spoil something that to you is simple, natural, and beautiful." Similarly, Le Gallienne told a friend, Eloise Armen, that love between women was "the most beautiful thing in the world."

Le Gallienne's first romantic relationship was with Mary Duggett, whom she called "Mimsey." They were together from 1917 to 1921, until Mimsey gave in to social and familial pressure and married Stuart Benson. The two women soon reconciled, however, and remained friends for life. Mimsey Benson took on the mantle of Business Manager at the Civic Rep.

In 1921, Eva went to Hollywood to visit the actress Alla Nazimova, whom she had met in New York several years previously. They established a romantic relationship. Nazimova was at the height of her fame and at that time wielded much power in the acting community. Nazimova introduced Le Gallienne to many influential people of the day.

Le Gallienne was reported to be romantically involved with actresses Tallulah Bankhead, Beatrice Lillie and Laurette Taylor, but there is no evidence for these claims among Le Gallienne's documents.

Between 1921 and 1926, Le Gallienne had relationships with writer and socialite Mercedes de Acosta and scenic designer Gladys Calthrop, as well as a brief affair with actor Basil Rathbone. But the love of her young life was actress Josephine Hutchinson, whom Le Gallienne invited to join the Civic Rep company in 1927. Hutchinson divorced her husband, Robert Bell, in 1930, having separated from him in 1928. Contrary to popular belief, Le Gallienne was not named as co-respondent in the divorce.

Le Gallienne and Hutchinson performed together in numerous plays at the Civic Repertory Theatre, including Dear Jane (1932), a play by Eleanor Holmes Hinkley based on the life of Jane Austen, and Alice in Wonderland, which was adapted for the stage by Le Gallienne and Florida Friebus in 1932. It was subsequently revived on Broadway in 1947 and 1982. American composer Gertrud Roberts wrote incidental music for a 1957 Hawaiian performance of Le Gallienne’s Alice in Wonderland.

Le Gallienne and Hutchinson split up in 1934. Le Gallienne had begun a relationship with Marion Gunnar Evensen-Westlake. They would be "companions" for the next three and a half decades.

Le Gallienne starred as Peter Pan in the production that opened at the Civic Rep on November 6, 1928. The flying effects were superbly designed, and for the first time Peter flew out over the heads of the audience. The critics loved "LeG", as she became known, and more than a few favored her performance over that of Maude Adams, the first to play the role on Broadway. The Civic Repertory Theatre presented Peter Pan 129 times.

In late 1929, just after the stock market crash, Le Gallienne was on the cover of Time magazine. During the Great Depression that followed, she was offered directorship of the Federal Theatre Project of the Works Progress Administration by President Franklin D. Roosevelt. She declined due to her belief that "it was mandatory to bring [the people] the highest standard of performance", rather than simply hiring any actors who were out of work.

In the late 1930s, Le Gallienne became involved in a relationship with theater director Margaret Webster. She, Webster, and producer Cheryl Crawford co-founded the American Repertory Theater, which operated from 1946 to 1948. (It bore no relation to the institution in Cambridge, Massachusetts, later founded by Robert Brustein.)

Throughout the 1940s and 50s, Le Gallienne performed in numerous productions both in New York and in the regions. In the late 1950s, she enjoyed great success playing the role of Queen Elizabeth in Mary Stuart. She also taught acting classes during this period and one of her pupils was Peter Falk. She was impressed with Falk's acting talents and provided a letter of recommendation that helped the young actor secure his first agent.

In 1964, Le Gallienne was presented with a Special Tony Award in recognition of her 50th year as an actress and in honor of her work with the National Repertory Theatre.

Le Gallienne returned to the Broadway spotlight in 1976, playing the role of Fanny Cavendish in the revival of The Royal Family, directed by Ellis Rabb. She won a 1978 Emmy Award for her performance in the televised production of the play. Around that time, she fell in love with Anne Kaufman Schneider, daughter of playwright George S. Kaufman, who co-authored The Royal Family. Le Gallienne and Schneider were in a romantic relationship for several years, after which they remained close friends until Le Gallienne's death.

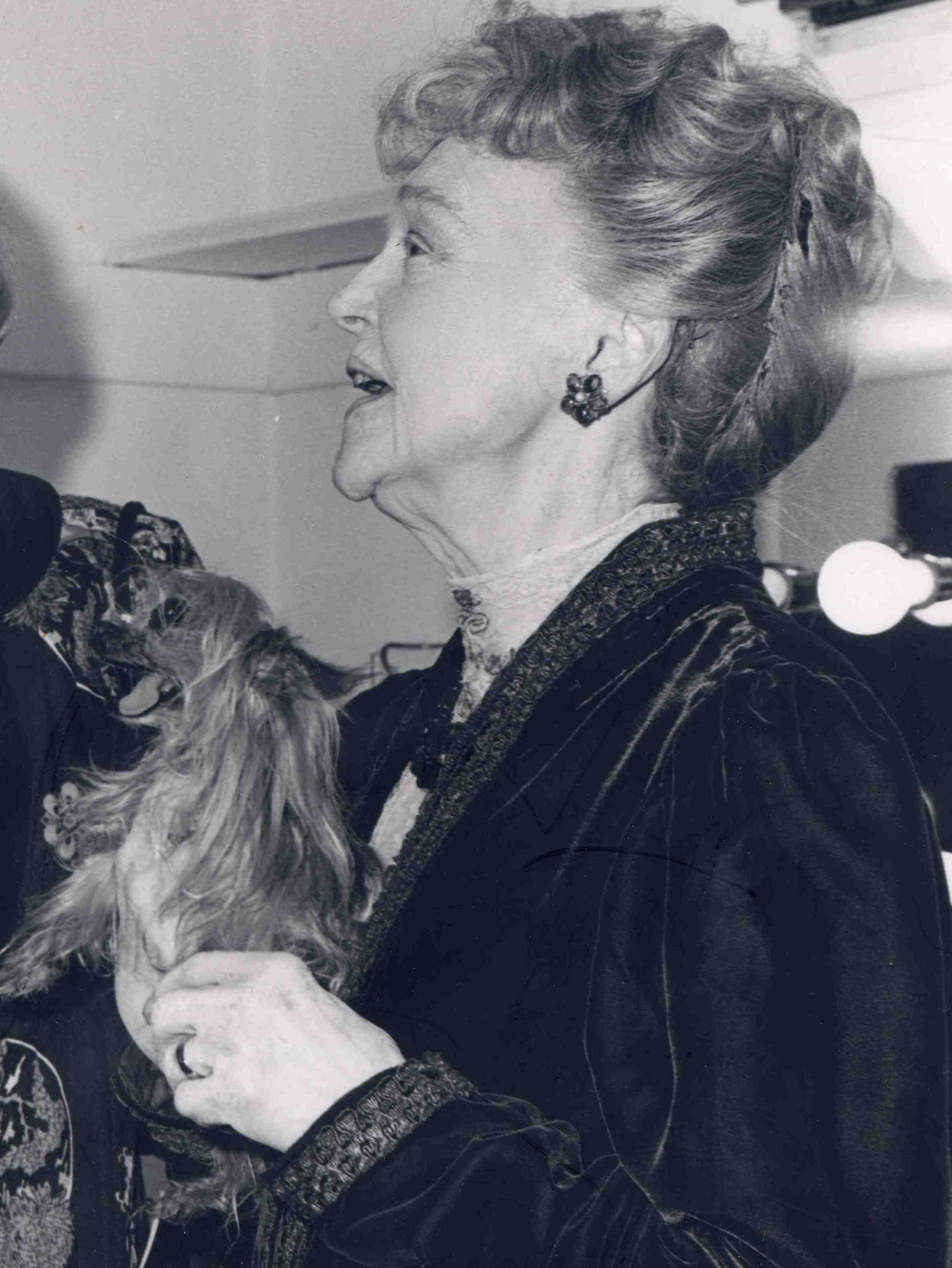
Le Gallienne in 1976

In 1982, Le Gallienne returned to the stage to play the White Queen in Alice in Wonderland at the Virginia Theatre, starring Kate Burton as Alice. In 1986, she was awarded the National Medal of Arts.

Although known primarily for her theater work, Le Gallienne also appeared in film and television productions. She earned an Oscar nomination for her work in Resurrection, for which she gained the honor of being the oldest Oscar nominee up to that time (1980) until Gloria Stuart was nominated in 1997. She made a rare guest appearance on a 1984 episode of St. Elsewhere which starred her former apprentice Norman Lloyd. She appeared with Brenda Vaccaro and Blythe Danner as three women sharing a hospital room.

Le Gallienne was a published writer. She wrote the children's book Flossie and Bossie, a tale of two barnyard hens, published by Harper and Row in 1949. The book, a social satire and comedy of manners, revolves around the enemies-to-friends romantic friendship of two hens, one popular and beautiful, the other socially uncomfortable and plain.

Her other books include two autobiographies, At 33 (1934, Longmans) and With a Quiet Heart (1953, Viking). She also wrote The Mystic in the Theatre, a book about Italian actress Eleonora Duse, who mentored Le Gallienne in the early 1920s. Le Gallienne translated 12 of Ibsen's plays into English and several works by Danish writer Hans Christian Andersen.

Le Gallienne died at her home in Weston, Connecticut, on June 3, 1991, aged 92. Her ashes were scattered over her property.

== Filmography ==
=== Film ===
Year	Title	Role	Notes
1955	Prince of Players	Gertrude in "Hamlet"	
1959	The Devil's Disciple	Mrs. Dudgeon	
1980	Resurrection	Grandma Pearl	National Board of Review Award for Best Supporting Actress; Nominated—Academy Award for Best Supporting Actress; Nominated—Saturn Award for Best Supporting Actress

=== Television ===
Year	Title	Role	Notes
1948	The Ford Theatre Hour	Annie Jones	Episode: Years Ago
1950	The Ford Theatre Hour	Lettie	Episode: Uncle Harry
1955	Alice in Wonderland	White Queen	TV movie
1956	The Corn is Green	Miss Moffat	TV movie
1958	The DuPont Show of the Month	Abbess	Episode: The Bridge of San Luis Rey
1958	Studio One in Hollywood	Martha Koering	Episode: The Shadow of a Genius
1958	Playhouse 90	Grandma James	Episode: Bitter Heritage
1960	Play of the Week	Queen Elizabeth	Episode: Mary Stuart
1977	The Royal Family	Fanny Cavendish	TV movie Primetime Emmy Award for Outstanding Performance by a Supporting Actress in a Drama or Comedy Special
1984	St. Elsewhere	Evelyn Milbourne	Episode: The Women, (final appearance)
