= Duchess (Alice's Adventures in Wonderland) =

- Alice character
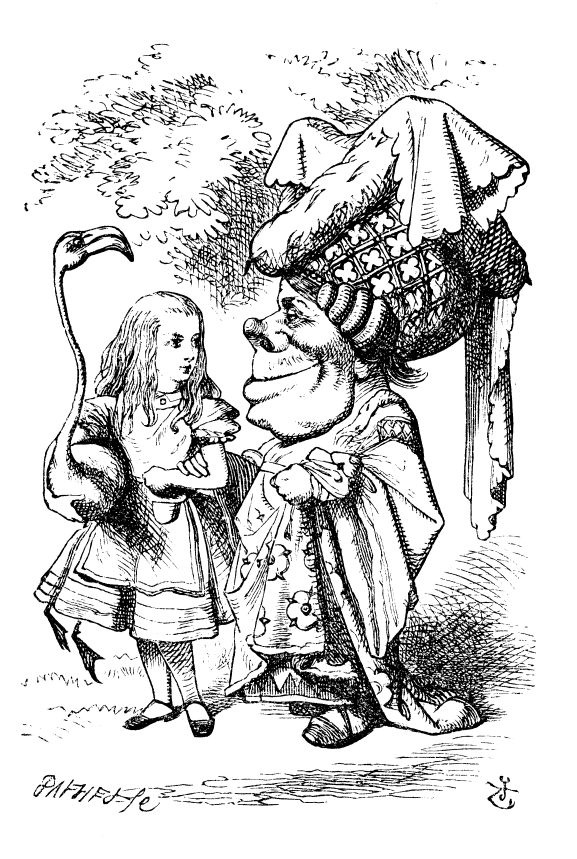
- Alice and the Duchess, 1865 illustration by John Tenniel
- First appearance: Alice's Adventures in Wonderland (1865)
- Created by: Lewis Carroll

In-universe information
- Species: Human
- Gender: Female
- Family: Queen of Hearts
- Nationality: Wonderland

The Duchess is a character in Lewis Carroll's Alice's Adventures in Wonderland, published in 1865. Carroll does not describe her physically in much detail, although as stated in Chapter 9, "Alice did not much like keeping so close to her: first, because the Duchess was very ugly; and secondly, because she was exactly the right height to rest her chin upon Alice’s shoulder, and it was an uncomfortably sharp chin." Her hideous appearance and short stature are strongly established in the popular imagination thanks to John Tenniel's illustrations and from context it is clear that Alice finds her quite unattractive.

== Origin ==
The Duchess is an antagonist of The Queen of Hearts. In her first appearance, the Duchess seems nearly as unpleasant as the Queen herself, but later on treats Alice with friendliness and respect.

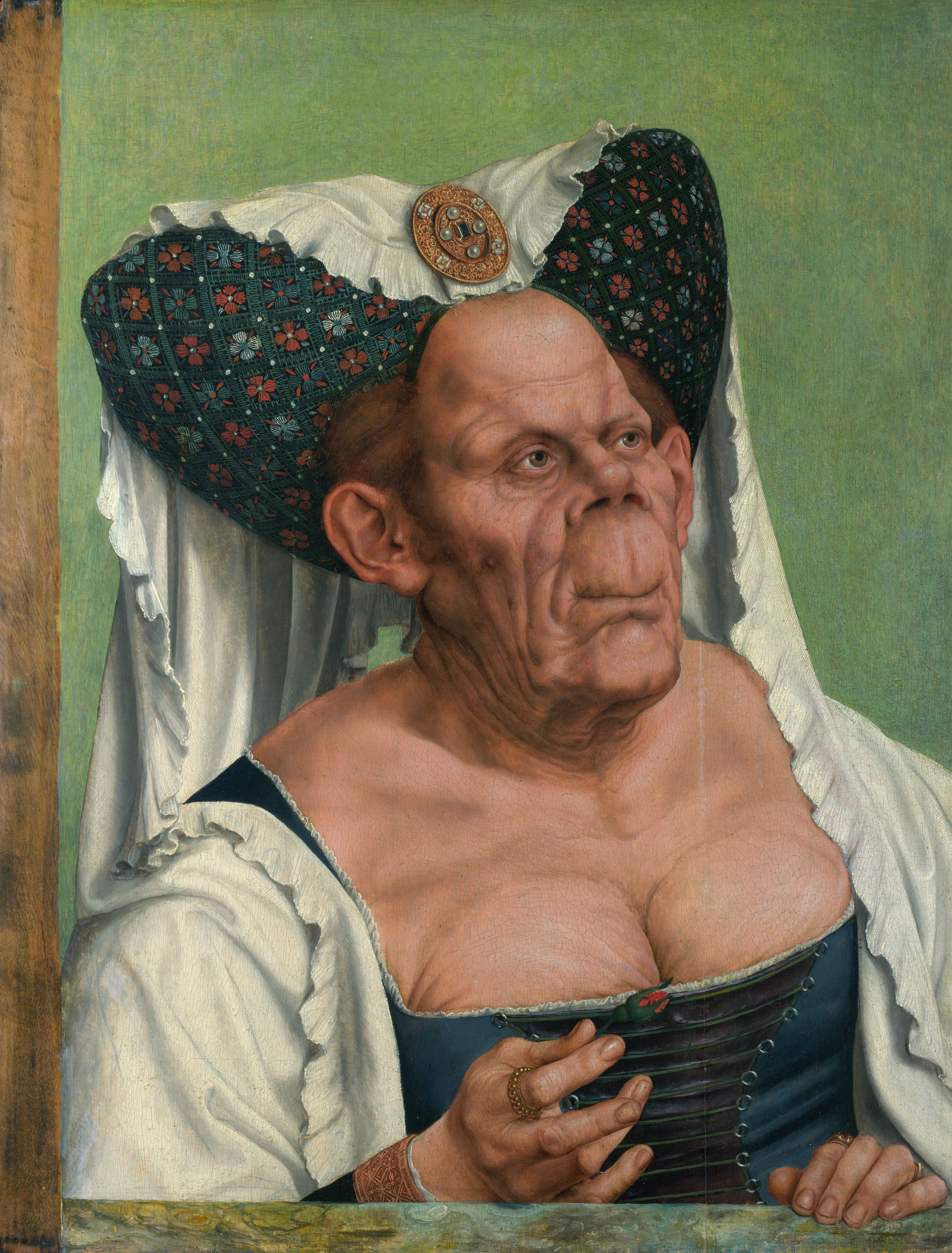
Quentin Matsys's The Ugly Duchess

According to Martin Gardner in The Annotated Alice, John Tenniel's drawings of the Duchess were inspired by Quentin Matsys's The Ugly Duchess (c. 1513) in the National Gallery.

== Description ==
The Duchess lives in Wonderland in a small house just outside the Caterpillar's forest. She employs a footman, whom Alice thinks resembles a frog, and a Cook, who is addicted to pepper and who throws crockery and kitchen utensils over her shoulder with no concern for those who might be hit. The footman enjoys staring at the sky for days on end, oblivious to most people in or out of the house. The Duchess also has a baby and a cat (the Cheshire Cat).

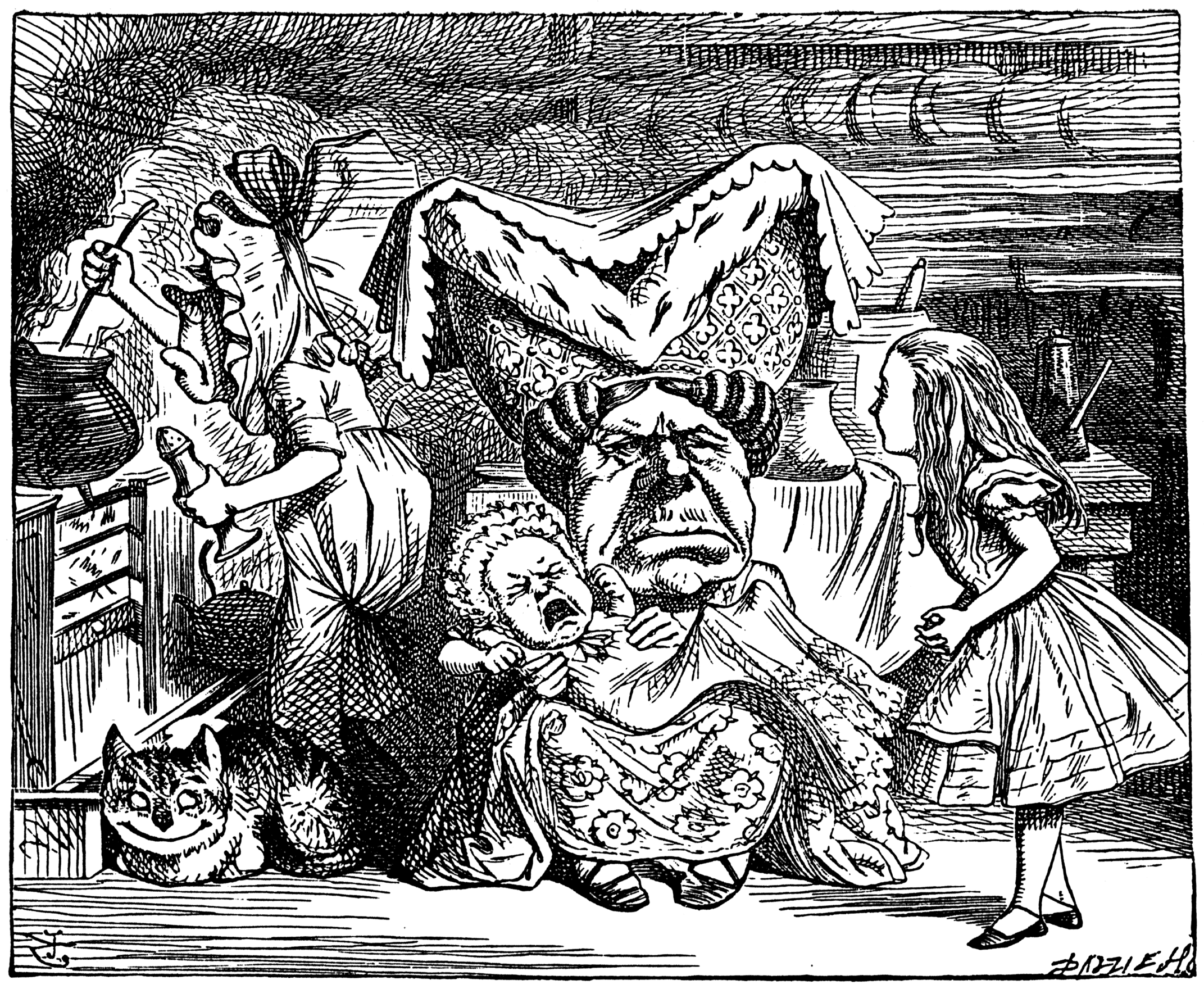
The Duchess with her family

Lewis Carroll is not explicit about her physical attributes, but Tenniel's drawings illustrate an ugly and grotesque woman with an extremely large head. Her character is strongly volatile; at times she even seems to have a double personality. When she first meets Alice in her kitchen, she shows herself to be nervously aggressive.

She recites one of the better-known rhymes in the book, when she advocates beating a child for sneezing:

Speak roughly to your little boy
and beat him when he sneezes
he only does it to annoy
because he knows it teases.
I speak severely to my boy
I beat him when he sneezes
for he can thoroughly enjoy
the pepper when he pleases

As the Cook has absolutely saturated the kitchen with pepper and the baby sneezes constantly, one can only conclude he has probably suffered quite a bit at his mother's hands. Taking pity on the child, Alice spirits him away, only to find that he has transformed into a pig. It is never explained why this happens, but Alice looks on the bright side, concluding that while the baby wasn't a very attractive baby, it makes for a good-looking pig.

Of the Duchess' household, the Cat appears to be by far the most balanced and sensible, although it states that—like everyone else in Wonderland—it is mad.

When Alice meets the Duchess for the second time at the Queen's croquet party, the Duchess is much more chatty and pleasant tempered. She repeatedly places her chin firmly on Alice's shoulder, which Alice finds disturbing as well as uncomfortable, as the Duchess has a very sharp, pointy chin. (In Kurt Vonnegut's novel Breakfast of Champions he also has a character do this, and Vonnegut breaks the fourth wall to tell readers that it is a direct homage to this famous scene with the Duchess.) Even so, Alice begins to suspect that the Duchess might actually have a pleasant personality after all, and that her earlier ruthlessness was caused by the pepper.

The Duchess is often seen as a child's-eye-view of emotionally volatile and mysterious adults, switching back and forth between dark moods and condescending affection at unpredictable times.

== The Duchess' Cook ==
The Duchess' Cook lives in the Duchess' Palace, is obsessed with pepper and throws it all over the place, causing the Baby and Duchess to sneeze constantly. She also smashes plates everywhere with crockery and kitchen utensils.

She is called to testify as a witness at the trial later in the book, and when told to give her evidence, she replies "Shan't." After the White Rabbit tells the King that he is required to cross examine this witness, the King asks her what tarts are made of, to which she answers "pepper."

=== Tim Burton ===
In the 2010 Tim Burton film, Thackery Earwicket (March Hare) shares many of The Cook's characteristics such as enjoying smashing plates and throwing pepper everywhere.

== Other media ==
- Martha Raye played the Duchess (and Imogene Coca the Cook) in the 1985 film Alice in Wonderland.
- The Duchess appeared in the Sunsoft's 2006 mobile game Alice's Warped Wonderland (歪みの国のアリス, Yugami no kuni no Arisu; Alice in Distortion World). She is an enormous and extremely overweight woman who eats non-stop for twelve years and Ariko (the "Alice" of the game) is tasked by her husband, The Duke, to make her stop.
- The Duchess appeared in the "Brooke Shields" episode of The Muppet Show (with the episode being the Muppet adaption of "Alice in Wonderland") performed by Kathryn Mullen. A Whatnot puppet was dressed up to play the Duchess.
- The Duchess also appears in John Kendrick Bangs' parody novel Alice in Blunderland: An Iridescent Dream.
- The Duchess appears as a minor character played by Teri Garr in the live-action Disney TV series Adventures in Wonderland.
- The Duchess is the first boss that Alice faces in American McGee's Alice. Appearing from the chimney, she is extremely large and ugly, wearing a stained apron and wielding a bizarre sort of pepper shaker, from which she shoots lethal black pepper at Alice—presumably belonging to her Cook, who is described in the book as putting excessive amounts of pepper in her cooking. In this version, she seems to be a cannibal, as her first lines indicate that Alice would make a nice light snack. After being defeated, she becomes intoxicated with pepper, and her head explodes. According to Bill the Lizard, the Duchess is hiding from the Queen of Hearts, hinting that they are still enemies. It appears, however, that the pepper has corrupted the Duchess, as it did in the book, but to a greater extent. She returns in the sequel of the game, Alice: Madness Returns. She has since learned her manners and adheres to a strict "pork" diet. In this game, she asks Alice to look for snouts throughout the game as a side mission.
- The character of the Duchess is drastically different in the SyFy channel's miniseries, Alice. In the SyFy re-imagining, the Duchess is tall, statuesque, blond and stunningly beautiful, dressed in revealing and sensual outfits. She is supposedly a sycophant of the Queen of Hearts, betrothed to Jack Heart, the Queen's son, so that the Queen might keep him under close surveillance due to his "rebellious" nature. When Prince Jack is sentenced to death by his mother for being a member of the Wonderland resistance, the Duchess helps him escape from the Eye Room, where he is being held for the night before his execution. During their escape, the Duchess reveals to Jack that she did only what was necessary to survive in the Queen's Court; she also reveals that she cares for Jack. Her last scene is at Jack's side when the Queen is confronted and forced to surrender after the destruction of the Casino. Her ultimate fate is not revealed.
- In the story Are You Alice?, the Duchess is shown to be a little girl with a fair complexion, pink short hair, and large eyes. On her hair lies a big hat, on her right side where one portion of her hair is curled as her bangs. She wears a black-and-white stripped dress fit to her small stature and size and big ribbon behind her neck. Underneath her outfit, she wears a pair of white undergarments reaching to her knees. She wears brown knee-high boots with laces of ribbon tied into it. Moreover, rather than being ugly she has a very cute appearance. Her role in this story is to be a replacement for Alice. She was executed by the Queen of Hearts for not fulfilling her role.
- In Tim Burton’s film, the Duchess does not appear but the Red Queen has her characteristic of a deformed face. The Red Queen also owns a pig which she abuses and uses as a footstool.
- In Marissa Meyer's 2016 novel Heartless, Catherine (the future Queen of Hearts) has a longtime acquaintance named Lady Margaret Mearle. Lady Margaret is described as being extremely ugly and morally righteous. Lady Margaret goes on to marry the Duke of Tuskany, who is in fact a warthog, and becomes the Duchess. Catherine dislikes the Duchess and is jealous of her happy marriage.
- Paulina Andreeva portrayed the Duchess in the 2025 Russian film Alice in Wonderland.
