= Alice's Wonderland Bakery =

American animated television series

- Promotional poster
- Genre: Fantasy; Comedy; Action; Adventure; Musical
- Based on: Alice's Adventures in Wonderland and Through the Looking-Glass by Lewis Carroll; Alice in Wonderland by Walt Disney
- Developed by: Chelsea Beyl
- Voices of: Libby Rue; Abigail Estrella; CJ Uy; Jack Stanton; Secunda Wood; Audrey Wasilewski
- Opening theme: "Alice's Wonderland Bakery Theme Song" performed by Libby Rue
- Ending theme: "The Baking Song" (instrumental)
- Composer: Matthew Margeson
- Country of origin: United States
- Original language: English
- No. of seasons: 2
- No. of episodes: 50 (100 segments)

Production
- Executive producer: Chelsea Beyl
- Producer: Ciara Anderson
- Running time: 22 minutes (Note: Each episode is composed of two 11-minute segments.)
- Production company: Disney Television Animation

Original release
- Network: Disney Junior
- Release: February 9, 2022 – April 15, 2024

Alice's Wonderland Bakery is an American animated television series created for Disney Junior by Chelsea Beyl, inspired by Alice in Wonderland (1951). The series centers on Alice, a young baker who works at the Wonderland Bakery and is the great-granddaughter of the original Alice. Rosa—the Princess of Hearts, Hattie, and Fergie the white rabbit accompany her on her culinary explorations throughout the kingdom. The show intends to highlight the importance of food, which is used as a form of self-expression and creativity. Libby Rue, Abigail Estrella, CJ Uy, Jack Stanton, Secunda Wood, and Audrey Wasilewski voice the primary characters.

The show is produced by Disney Television Animation and aired on Disney Junior from February 9, 2022, to April 15, 2024. On the same day of the premiere, the first six episodes were released early on Disney+. In April 2022, the series was renewed for a second and final season. In April 2024, the series was announced to end after 2 seasons and 50 episodes. Critical reviews of the show have generally been positive. At the 1st Children's and Family Emmy Awards, Eden Espinosa (who voices the Queen of Hearts) received a nomination for Outstanding Voice Performance in a Preschool Animated Program.

== Plot ==
The series revolves around Alice, the great-granddaughter of the original Alice, who is a young baker working at the Wonderland Bakery. As she explores the kingdom on various culinary adventures, she is accompanied by Fergie the white rabbit, Hattie, and Rosa—the Princess of Hearts.

The teapot-shaped Wonderland Bakery has a kitchen where some of the equipment is animated, namely the oven and the mixer. The bakery also has a pantry, a steep tunnel with ingredients on shelves along the sides, and anyone who enters will mostly float inside, as if they are in space. The desserts (and to a lesser extent foods) the characters make are mostly magical, resulting in either troublesome or pleasant effects.

== Cast and characters ==
=== Main ===
- Libby Rue as Alice, the great-granddaughter of the original Alice and a promising young baker at the magical Wonderland Bakery.
- CJ Uy as Hattie, a "Hatter" boy and Alice's friend who is extremely silly, and a descendant of the Mad Hatter.
- Jack Stanton as Fergie, Alice's best friend who admires her greatly, and a descendant of the White Rabbit.
- Abigail Estrella as Princess Rosa, the Princess of Hearts and Alice's creative friend. She is a descendant of the Queen of Hearts.
- Secunda Wood as Cookie, a magical cookbook previously owned by Alice's great-grandmother.
- Audrey Wasilewski as Dinah, Alice's pet cat who always accompanies her, and a descendant of the original Dinah.

=== Recurring ===
- Craig Ferguson as The Doorknob, an anthropomorphic doorknob who can teleport passers to any place in Wonderland.
- Eden Espinosa as Valentina the Queen of Hearts, the ruler of Wonderland and Rosa's mother.
- Jon Secada as King of Hearts, the previous ruler of Wonderland, and the Queen's widowed father.
- Vanessa Bayer and Bobby Moynihan as Tweedle Do and Tweedle Don't respectively, two upbeat twins descended from Tweedledum and Tweedledee who help individuals decide on something by debating each other.
- Donald Faison as Harry the March Hare, an eccentric clothing designer.
- Rich Sommer as Captain Dodo, a bird sailor who lives in a boat that has gone aground.
- Max Mittelman as Cheshire Cat
- Dee Bradley Baker as Jabbie, a baby Jabberwock.
- George Salazar as Dad Hatter, Hattie's father, and Harry's friend.
- Melissa van der Schyff as Jojo, Captain Dodo's daughter.
- Mandy Gonzalez as Mother Rose, the leader of the anthropomorphic flowers, and a brewer of tea remedies.
- Yvette Nicole Brown as Mama Rabbit, Fergie's mother.
- Lesley Nicol as Iris, Mother Rose's friend.
- Ali Stroker as Daisy
- Merle Dandridge as Silver Queen, the ruler of a hidden realm accessible only to an enchanted mirror in the bakery. She is seemingly based on the Red Queen and White Queen.
- Swayam Bhatia as Kyra the Knight, an aspiring soldier in the Silver Queen's realm.
- Sam Lavagnino as Cam the Dormouse.

=== Guest ===
- Ana Gasteyer as Kiki
- Yuri Lowenthal as Jay
- Lamorne Morris as Dandy
- Christopher Fitzgerald as Thistle
- Matthew Moy as David of Spades
- James Monroe Iglehart as Oliver
- Kausar Mohammed as Mrs. Parvaneh
- Marcel Nahapetian as Saeed
- Mark Williams as Ribbitton
- Karen Fukuhara as Sakura
- Isabella Abiera as Milly the Carpenter
- Sam Kalidi as Jacques Mock Turtle
- Kathryn Beaumont as Original Alice

== Episodes ==
=== Series overview ===
Season	Episodes	Originally released	
Season	Episodes	First released	Last released
1	25	February 9, 2022	March 31, 2023
2	25	June 28, 2023	April 15, 2024

=== Season 1 (2022–23) ===
No. overall	No. in season	Title	Directed by	Written by	Original release date	Prod. code	U.S. viewers (millions)
1	1	"Unforgettable Unbirthday"	Directed by : Nathan Chew; Storyboarded by : Kaho Kubo & Arielle Yett	Chelsea Beyl	February 9, 2022	101	0.22
1	1	"Picnic for One"	Directed by : Arielle Yett; Storyboarded by : James Little & Stevie Wermers-Skelton	Chelsea Beyl	February 9, 2022	101	0.22
2	2	"Try Again Tart"	Directed by : Steven Umbleby; Storyboarded by : Scotland Barnes	Michael Rodriguez	February 10, 2022 (Note: This episode was first released on Disney+ on February 9, 2022.)	102	0.18
2	2	"Pie Pressure"	Directed by : Arielle Yett; Storyboarded by : Isabelle Gedigk & Stevie Wermers-Skelton	Marisa Evans-Sanden	February 10, 2022	102	0.18
3	3	"No Palace Like Home"	Directed by : Steven Umbleby; Storyboarded by : Eugene Salandra	Stuart Friedel	February 11, 2022	103	0.21
3	3	"A Royal Remembrance"	Directed by : Arielle Yett; Storyboarded by : Chris Otsuki & Samantha Arnett	Michael Rodriguez	February 11, 2022	103	0.21
4	4	"Alice's Stormy Afternoon"	Directed by : Steven Umbleby; Storyboarded by : Kaho Kubo & Stevie Wermers-Skelton	Marisa Evans-Sanden	February 18, 2022	104	0.22
4	4	"Into the Tulgey Wood"	Directed by : Arielle Yett; Storyboarded by : James Little & Arielle Yett	Stuart Friedel	February 18, 2022	104	0.22
5	5	"Gallymoggers Granola"	Directed by : Steven Umbleby; Storyboarded by : Stevie Wermers-Skelton & Eugene Salandra	Melinda LaRose	February 25, 2022	105	0.23
5	5	"Sour Grapes"	Directed by : Arielle Yett; Storyboarded by : Scotland Barnes & Isabelle Gedigk	Marisa Evans-Sanden	February 25, 2022	105	0.23
6	6	"Cookie's Day Off"	Directed by : Steven Umbleby; Storyboarded by : Samantha Arnett	Lisa Kettle	March 4, 2022	106	0.22
6	6	"Picture Furfect"	Directed by : Arielle Yett; Storyboarded by : Chris Otsuki & Isabelle Gedigk	Stuart Friedel	March 4, 2022	106	0.22
7	7	"Order Up!"	Directed by : Steven Umbleby; Storyboarded by : Kaho Kubo & Eugene Salandra	Michael Rodriguez	March 11, 2022	107	0.20
7	7	"Teeny-Tiny Venture"	Directed by : Arielle Yett; Storyboarded by : James Little & Stevie Wermers-Skelton	Sara Karimipour	March 11, 2022	107	0.20
8	8	"Another Alice"	Directed by : Steven Umbleby; Storyboarded by : Scotland Barnes & Eugene Salandra	Michael Rodriguez	March 18, 2022	108	0.19
8	8	"Fergie Plays the Palace"	Directed by : Arielle Yett; Storyboarded by : Isabelle Gedigk & Kelly Hobby-Bishop	Lisa Kettle	March 18, 2022	108	0.19
9	9	"Dodo Dilemma"	Directed by : Steven Umbleby; Storyboarded by : Samantha Arnett & Stevie Wermers-Skelton	Chelsea Beyl	March 25, 2022	109	0.19
9	9	"Horsin' Around"	Directed by : Arielle Yett; Storyboarded by : Chris Otsuki & Stevie Wermers-Skelton	Melinda LaRose	March 25, 2022	109	0.19
10	10	"Potato Potahto"	Directed by : Steven Umbleby; Storyboarded by : Kaho Kubo & Eugene Salandra	Stuart Friedel	April 1, 2022	110	0.19
10	10	"Hattie's Inside-out Cake"	Directed by : Arielle Yett; Storyboarded by : James Little & Arielle Yett	Marisa Evans-Sanden	April 1, 2022	110	0.19
11	11	"Easy Breezy"	Directed by : Steven Umbleby; Storyboarded by : Scotland Barnes & Eugene Salandra	Michael Rodriguez	April 8, 2022	111	0.18
11	11	"Walk the Jabberwock"	Directed by : Arielle Yett; Storyboarded by : Isabelle Gedigk & Stevie Wermers-Skelton	Stuart Friedel	April 8, 2022	111	0.18
12	12	"Roamin' Holiday"	Directed by : Steven Umbleby; Storyboarded by : Samantha Arnett & Eugene Salandra	Lisa Kettle	April 15, 2022	112	0.27
12	12	"The Proof is in the Pudding"	Directed by : Arielle Yett; Storyboarded by : Chris Otsuki & Stevie Wermers-Skelton	Michael Rodriguez	April 15, 2022	112	0.27
13	13	"A Royally Mad Tea Party"	Directed by : Steven Umbleby; Storyboarded by : Kaho Kubo & Steven Umbleby	Marisa Evans-Sanden	April 29, 2022	113	0.16
13	13	"Jojo's Bye-Bye Party"	Directed by : Arielle Yett; Storyboarded by : Kelly Hobby-Bishop, James Little & Chris Otsuki	Stuart Friedel	April 29, 2022	113	0.16
14	14	"Fergie Suits Up"	Directed by : Steven Umbleby; Storyboarded by : Scotland Barnes & Stevie Wermers-Skelton	Holly Huckins	May 13, 2022	114	0.12
14	14	"Look Who's Knocking"	Directed by : Arielle Yett; Storyboarded by : Janice Seungmee Rim & Eugene Salandra	Marisa Evans-Sanden	May 13, 2022	114	0.12
15	15	"A Special Blend"	Directed by : Arielle Yett; Storyboarded by : Kaho Kubo & Eugene Salandra	Michael Rodriguez	June 10, 2022	116	0.16
15	15	"The Princess and the Hare"	Directed by : Steven Umbleby; Storyboarded by : Chris Otsuki, Steven Umbleby & Lynell H. Forestall	Lisa Kettle	June 10, 2022	116	0.16
16	16	"Meet the Tweedles"	Directed by : Arielle Yett; Storyboarded by : Scotland Barnes & Eugene Salandra	Stuart Friedel	July 1, 2022	117	0.17
16	16	"A Very Wonderland Wedding"	Directed by : Steven Umbleby; Storyboarded by : Janice Seungmee Rim & Kelly Hobby-Bishop	Sara Karimipour	July 1, 2022	117	0.17
17	17	"Bubbling Over"	Directed by : Arielle Yett; Storyboarded by : Samantha Arnett & Lynell H. Forestall	Melinda LaRose	August 5, 2022	118	0.13
17	17	"The Card Guard Shuffle"	Directed by : Steven Umbleby; Storyboarded by : Kelly Hobby-Bishop & James Little	Stuart Friedel	August 5, 2022	118	0.13
18	18	"A Rose Between Two Thorns"	Directed by : Arielle Yett; Storyboarded by : Kaho Kubo & Eugene Salandra	Marisa Evans-Sanden	August 12, 2022	119	0.09
18	18	"Double Dinah"	Directed by : Steven Umbleby; Storyboarded by : Chris Otsuki & Kelly Hobby-Bishop	Lisa Kettle	August 12, 2022	119	0.09
19	19	"Cream Puffs of Champions"	Directed by : Arielle Yett; Storyboarded by : Scotland Barnes & Eugene Salandra	Michael Rodriguez	September 2, 2022	120	0.10
19	19	"Fluffle Kerfuffle"	Directed by : Steven Umbleby; Storyboarded by : Janice Seungmee Rim & Kelly Hobby-Bishop	Marisa Evans-Sanden	September 2, 2022	120	0.10
20	20	"If the Shoe Hat Fits"	Directed by : Arielle Yett; Storyboarded by : Samantha Arnett, Lynell H. Forestall & Eugene Salandra	Stuart Friedel	October 7, 2022	121	0.09
20	20	"Cookie is Booked"	Directed by : Steven Umbleby; Storyboarded by : Wendy Grieb & James Little	Michael Rodriguez	October 7, 2022	121	0.09
21	21	"The Gingerbread Palace"	Directed by : Nathan Chew; Storyboarded by : Samantha Arnett, James Little, Stevie Wermers-Skelton & Kelly Hobby-Bishop	Chelsea Beyl	November 29, 2022	115	0.23
22	22	"It's the Hatter that Matters"	Directed by : Arielle Yett; Storyboarded by : Kaho Kubo & Wendy Grieb	Marisa Evans-Sanden	January 13, 2023 (Note: This episode was first released on Disney+ on December 7, 2022.)	122	N/A
22	22	"Cheshire's Cat-Astrophe"	Directed by : Steven Umbleby; Storyboarded by : Chris Otsuki & Kelly Hobby-Bishop	Melinda LaRose	January 13, 2023	122	N/A
23	23	"Queen Alice"	Directed by : Arielle Yett; Storyboarded by : Scotland Barnes & Eugene Salandra	Lisa Kettle	February 17, 2023	123	0.11
23	23	"A Kuku Surprise"	Directed by : Steven Umbleby; Storyboarded by : Kelly Hobby-Bishop & Janice Seungmee Rim	Sara Karimipour	February 17, 2023	123	0.11
24	24	"Back to the Root"	Directed by : Arielle Yett; Storyboarded by : Lynell H. Forestall & Eugene Salandra	Michael Rodriguez	March 17, 2023	124	0.15
24	24	"Alice the Piefectionist"	Directed by : Steven Umbleby; Storyboarded by : Kelly Hobby-Bishop & James Little	Stuart Friedel	March 17, 2023	124	0.15
25	25	"Sunny-Side-Up"	Directed by : Arielle Yett; Storyboarded by : Kaho Kubo & Eugene Salandra	Chelsea Beyl	March 31, 2023	125	0.11
25	25	"A Supreme Pizza Problem"	Directed by : Steven Umbleby; Storyboarded by : Scotland Barnes & Chris Otsuki	Marisa Evans-Sanden	March 31, 2023	125	0.11

=== Season 2 (2023–24) ===
No. overall	No. in season	Title	Directed by	Written by	Original release date	Prod. code	U.S. viewers (millions)
26	1	"Hattie Wishes Upon a Star"	Directed by : Arielle Yett; Storyboarded by : Lynell H. Forestall & James Little	Marisa Evans-Sanden	June 28, 2023	202	N/A
26	1	"Season's Eatings"	Directed by : Steven Umbleby; Storyboarded by : James Little & Kelly Hobby-Bishop	Stuart Friedel	June 28, 2023	202	N/A
27	2	"Party Like Kiki!"	Directed by : Arielle Yett; Storyboarded by : Kaho Kubo & Eugene Salandra	Sara Karimipour	June 28, 2023	203	N/A
27	2	"The Puff Pastry Palace"	Directed by : Steven Umbleby; Storyboarded by : Chris Otsuki & Kelly Hobby-Bishop	Lisa Kettle	June 28, 2023	203	N/A
28	3	"Fiesta of the Red & White Roses"	Directed by : Arielle Yett; Storyboarded by : Scotland Barnes & Eugene Salandra	Michael Rodriguez	June 29, 2023 (Note: This episode was released on Disney+ on June 28, 2023.)	204	0.10
28	3	"Peanut Butter Change-Up"	Directed by : Steven Umbleby; Storyboarded by : Janice Seungmee Rim & Kelly Hobby-Bishop	Marisa Evans-Sanden	June 29, 2023	204	0.10
29	4	"Freeze!"	Directed by : Arielle Yett; Storyboarded by : Lynell H. Forestall & Eugene Salandra	Stuart Friedel	June 30, 2023	205	N/A
29	4	"The A-Team"	Directed by : Steven Umbleby; Storyboarded by : James Little & Renee Badua	Sara Karimipour	June 30, 2023	205	N/A
30	5	"The Looking Glass Leap"	Directed by : Arielle Yett; Storyboarded by : Kaho Kubo & Eugene Salandra	Chelsea Beyl	July 1, 2023	206	N/A
30	5	"Backwards Buttercake"	Directed by : Steven Umbleby; Storyboarded by : Chris Otsuki & Kelly Hobby-Bishop	Marisa Evans-Sanden	July 1, 2023	206	N/A
31	6	"Alice's Tea Party To-Go-Cart"	Directed by : Arielle Yett; Storyboarded by : Scotland Barnes & Eugene Salandra	Stuart Friedel	July 2, 2023	207	N/A
31	6	"Croquet Away"	Directed by : Steven Umbleby; Storyboarded by : Janice Seungmee Rim & Kelly Hobby-Bishop	Melinda LaRose	July 2, 2023	207	N/A
32	7	"Two Many Teas"	Directed by : Arielle Yett; Storyboarded by : Lynell H. Forestall & Wendy Grieb	Melinda LaRose	July 7, 2023	208	N/A
32	7	"A Tailored Treat"	Directed by : Steven Umbleby; Storyboarded by : James Little & Kelly Hobby-Bishop	Roxy Simons	July 7, 2023	208	N/A
33	8	"Hats and Hares"	Directed by : Arielle Yett; Storyboarded by : Wendy Grieb & Eugene Salandra	Michael Rodriguez	July 14, 2023	210	0.14
33	8	"Forget-Me-Now"	Directed by : Steven Umbleby; Storyboarded by : Janice Seungmee Rim & Kelly Hobby-Bishop	Melinda LaRose	July 14, 2023	210	0.14
34	9	"Mopsy-Turvy"	Directed by : Steven Umbleby; Storyboarded by : Chris Otsuki & Kelly Hobby-Bishop	Stuart Friedel	July 21, 2023	211	0.13
34	9	"Jambalaya Jamboree"	Directed by : Steven Umbleby; Storyboarded by : James Little & Lidia Liu	Lisa Kettle	July 21, 2023	211	0.13
35	10	"A Hare Raising Halloween"	Directed by : Arielle Yett; Storyboarded by : Scotland Barnes & Eugene Salandra	Stuart Friedel	September 30, 2023	201	N/A
35	10	"Fergie Turns the Tide"	Directed by : Steven Umbleby; Storyboarded by : Janice Seungmee Rim & Kelly Hobby-Bishop	Lisa Kettle	September 30, 2023	201	N/A
36	11	"A Knight to Remember"	Directed by : Arielle Yett; Storyboarded by : Kaho Kubo & Eugene Salandra	Melinda LaRose	October 7, 2023	212	N/A
36	11	"Roaring Daisylions"	Directed by : Steven Umbleby; Storyboarded by : Chris Otsuki & Kelly Hobby-Bishop	Sara Karimipour	October 7, 2023	212	N/A
37	12	"The Sweetest Friend Indeed"	Directed by : Arielle Yett; Storyboarded by : Lynell H. Forestall & Eugene Salandra	Jack Monaco	October 28, 2023 (Note: This episode was released on Disney+ on October 11, 2023.)	214	N/A
37	12	"Hats Off to Cam"	Directed by : Steven Umbleby; Storyboarded by : James Little & Kelly Hobby-Bishop	Melinda LaRose	October 28, 2023	214	N/A
38	13	"Jacques Turtelle's Soup"	Directed by : Steven Umbleby; Storyboarded by : Scotland Barnes & Eugene Salandra	Stuart Friedel	November 4, 2023	216	N/A
38	13	"The Curious Case of Crumbs"	Directed by : Arielle Yett; Storyboarded by : Janice Seungmee Rim & Kelly Hobby-Bishop	Marisa Evans-Sanden	November 4, 2023	216	N/A
39	14	"Alice's First Day in Wonderland"	Directed by : Nathan Chew; Storyboarded by : Kaho Kubo, Chris Otsuki, Eugene Salandra & Kelly Hobby-Bishop	Chelsea Beyl	December 3, 2023	215	0.04
40	15	"A Hat-Bachi Hanukkah"	Directed by : Arielle Yett; Storyboarded by : Jules Bridgers & Lynell H. Forestall	Stuart Friedel	December 9, 2023	209	N/A
40	15	"A Snow-Drop Summer"	Directed by : Steven Umbleby; Storyboarded by : Wendy Grieb & Kaho Kubo	Marisa Evans-Sanden	December 9, 2023	209	N/A
41	16	"A Dumpling Thing"	Directed by : Steven Umbleby; Storyboarded by : Wendy Grieb & Kaho Kubo	Stuart Friedel	December 10, 2023	218	0.06
41	16	"A Tasteful Game of Croquet"	Directed by : Arielle Yett; Storyboarded by : Chris Otsuki & Arielle Yett	Melinda LaRose	December 10, 2023	218	0.06
42	17	"Switcheroo Day"	Directed by : Steven Umbleby; Storyboarded by : Scotland Barnes & Wendy Grieb	Melinda LaRose	December 16, 2023	219	N/A
42	17	"Once in a Wondermoon"	Directed by : Arielle Yett; Storyboarded by : Kelly Hobby-Bishop & Janice Seungmee Rim	Marisa Evans-Sanden	December 16, 2023	219	N/A
43	18	"Where There's a Whisk, There's a Way"	Directed by : Steven Umbleby; Storyboarded by : Lynell H. Forestall & Eugene Salandra	Lisa Kettle	December 17, 2023	220	N/A
43	18	"Hats Away!"	Directed by : Arielle Yett; Storyboarded by : James Little & Kelly Hobby-Bishop	Jack Monaco	December 17, 2023	220	N/A
44	19	"A Heart-Filled Harmony"	Directed by : Steven Umbleby; Storyboarded by : Lynell H. Forestall & Eugene Salandra	Marisa Evans-Sanden	February 12, 2024 (Note: This episode was first released on Disney+ on January 10, 2024.)	217	0.07
44	19	"Happy Cheshire Day!"	Directed by : Arielle Yett; Storyboarded by : James Little & Kelly Hobby-Bishop	Michael Rodriguez	February 12, 2024	217	0.07
45	20	"Dance of the Cherry Blossoms"	Directed by : Arielle Yett; Storyboarded by : Jules Bridgers & Wendy Grieb	Lisa Kettle	March 11, 2024	213	N/A
45	20	"Alice and the Carpenter"	Directed by : Steven Umbleby; Storyboarded by : Janice Seungmee Rim & Wendy Grieb	Marisa Evans-Sanden	March 11, 2024	213	N/A
46	21	"Here Kitty Kitty"	Directed by : Steven Umbleby; Storyboarded by : Kaho Kubo & Eugene Salandra	Melinda LaRose	March 18, 2024	221	N/A
46	21	"The Bread and Butterfly Effect"	Directed by : Arielle Yett; Storyboarded by : Wendy Grieb & Chris Otsuki	Stuart Friedel	March 18, 2024	221	N/A
47	22	"A Spicy Situation"	Directed by : Steven Umbleby; Storyboarded by : Scotland Barnes & Eugene Salandra	Melinda LaRose	March 25, 2024	222	N/A
47	22	"Iris on the Beach"	Directed by : Arielle Yett; Storyboarded by : Kelly Hobby-Bishop & Janice Seungmee Rim	Marisa Evans-Sanden	March 25, 2024	222	N/A
48	23	"Alice's Wonderful Baking School"	Directed by : Steven Umbleby; Storyboarded by : Lynell H. Forestall & Eugene Salandra	Written by : Lisa Kettle; Story by : Chelsea Beyl & Lisa Kettle	April 1, 2024	223	N/A
48	23	"Ze Cookie Pizza"	Directed by : Arielle Yett; Storyboarded by : Kelly Hobby-Bishop & James Little	Stuart Friedel	April 1, 2024	223	N/A
49	24	"Captain Dodo's Snack Shack"	Directed by : Steven Umbleby; Storyboarded by : Kaho Kubo & Eugene Salandra	Michael Rodriguez	April 8, 2024 (Note: This episode was first released on Disney+ on April 3, 2024.)	224	N/A
49	24	"A Piece of Cake"	Directed by : Arielle Yett; Storyboarded by : Kelly Hobby-Bishop & Chris Otsuki	Paige Desjardins	April 8, 2024	224	N/A
50	25	"Clever Clover"	Directed by : Steven Umbleby; Storyboarded by : Scotland Barnes & Eugene Salandra	Marisa Evans-Sanden	April 15, 2024	225	N/A
50	25	"Alice Comes to Her Senses"	Directed by : Arielle Yett; Storyboarded by : Kelly Hobby-Bishop & Janice Seungmee Rim	Melinda LaRose	April 15, 2024	225	N/A

== Production ==
=== Development ===
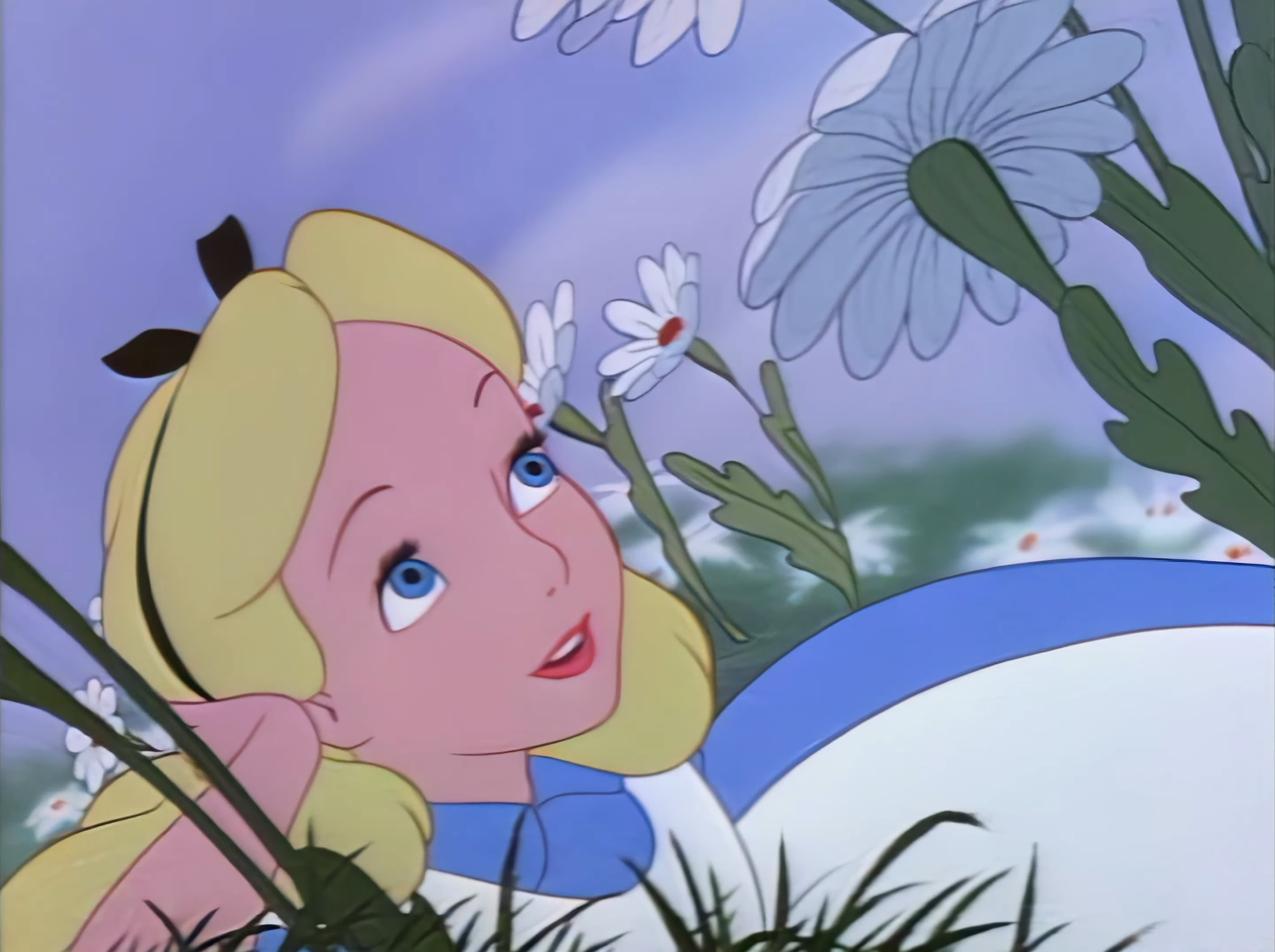
Alice's Wonderland Bakery is based on the 1951 Disney film Alice in Wonderland.

Alice's Wonderland Bakery is based on Disney's animated feature Alice in Wonderland (1951), which in turn is based on the Alice book series by Lewis Carroll. In the film, there is a scene in which the Mad Hatter hosts a tea party with teapots that pipe music, hats producing three-layer frosted cakes, and exploding firework candles in the sky. Disney Television Animation decided to produce a heritage project based upon the scene, which would also take inspiration from the sense of connection brought by food. Creator Chelsea Beyl said: "I started thinking about all the whimsy, the comedy, and the peculiar characters that are in the original movie and thought, 'Wow, preschoolers are going to love this' ... It's silly. And then we're combining all that with baking, which, of course, kids love to do as well." In May 2021, Disney Junior greenlit the series, to air on the network in 2022.

According to co-executive producer and art director Frank Montagna, the shift in storytelling from a 1950s animated film to a 2022 animated preschool TV series was unexpectedly simple. He stated that there are many enjoyable activities in Wonderland, such as the tea parties, cards, and mazes. The team removed the frightening elements from the original film and kept the entertaining ones. Throughout the book and the film, there are references to the words "Eat me" and "Drink me". Because of this, Montaga came up with the idea of fusing Alice in Wonderland with a bakery when Beyl initially presented the show to him. The show highlights the importance of food, which is used as a form of creativity and self-expression; Alice makes friends and learns of other cultures through food. Beyl stated that "food [is] essentially [Alice's] superpower ... [and] how she connects with all these curious and peculiar characters." The series pays homage to the original Alice, who is always thinking, by having its version of Alice constantly trying to figure out things.

On June 6, 2023, it was announced that Kathryn Beaumont (who voiced Alice in the 1951 Disney film) would be making a guest appearance in the 22-minute special "Alice's First Day in Wonderland".

On April 1, 2024, Disney Junior's social media accounts released a list of their April 2024 programming, announcing the series finale.

=== Writing and design ===
It did not take Montagna long to come up with the design for Alice's Wonderland Bakery since the original Alice in Wonderland "has always been such a core part of [his] being". Since the original designs were so shaped-driven and everything was already round, bouncy, and rubbery, he found converting them into 3D models rather easy. The team at ICON Creative Studio, according to Montagna, worked tirelessly to give the show a "bouncy and rubbery" feel, particularly with the Cheshire Cat—the only character from the 1951 film to appear in the series. Montagna believed that the team truly needed him to embody his role from the original film. Since television computer animation budgets were rather small, many factors needed to be considered carefully. For the character to be correctly rigged, the team would need to be very clear about how they wanted the character to look.

The team wanted the characters to truly reflect modern-day children, which also required giving them origins that Carroll may never have imagined. Beyl sought to reimagine some characters from the original film to enrich Wonderland with a wider range of cultures. The Hatter family's character design, kitchen—as well as the recipes Alice and Hattie cook together—are drawn from Japanese culture. Meanwhile, several aspects of the Hearts family were influenced by Cuban cuisine and culture, including their dialogue (which includes Spanish words), clothing, palace, and set design. The show later introduces a Persian-influenced caterpillar family. Certain characters are also gender flipped. Numerous foods from different cultures are featured in the series, including pastelitos (Cuban), mochi (Japanese), carrot calzone, grape gazpacho, huevos habaneros and kuku sib zamini (Persian).

The series references several iterations of Alice in Wonderland, including the 2010 film directed by Tim Burton. The Rabbit Hole served as the model for Alice's pantry, which features an endless supply of food items. For the ingredients, the team aimed to combine wacky Wonderland-style elements with real-world meals. Examples of this are "Bread and Butterflies", "Disa-pears", and "Rea-pears". Since nothing is impossible in Wonderland, the team was able to incorporate many unrealistic food ideas into the show, including an upside-down cake.

=== Music ===
John Kavanaugh was appointed music director. He wrote and composed "The Baking Song", which appears often throughout the show in various forms: the queen sings a salsa rendition, while another episode features a version with Persian instruments. The 1951 film's song "The Unbirthday Song", as well as other songs by Kavanaugh, including "Food for Thought", are used in the series to convey concepts such as flexibility. The voice cast includes former Broadway performers because the emphasis on music required vocal talent. On February 11, 2022, Walt Disney Records released the show's digital soundtrack album. The main title theme was released as a single.

== Broadcast ==
The series originally premiered on February 9, 2022. On the same day, first six episodes were released early on on-demand and Disney+. The first season is streamable on Disney+, FuboTV, and Amazon Prime Video. In April 2022, the show was renewed for a second season, which premiered on June 28, 2023.

== Reception ==
=== Critical response ===
Harlan Sharpe of Fatherly praised the show for "[not] trying to remake Alice in Wonderland, [but] trying to give families a magical and offbeat show that is pro-baking." GeekMom favorably compared the series to the animated children's show True and the Rainbow Kingdom, writing, "The series aims to celebrate diversity through the use of food to highlight culture, collaboration, and the value of community." Laurel Graeber of The New York Times said that the show highlights creativity, while taking notice of the cultural diversity of the characters and their voice actors compared to the original Alice in Wonderland.

Ashley Moulton of Common Sense Media gave the show a grade of three out of five stars in her review, in which she described it as "a fun treat, but not one of Disney's standouts". She praised the characters, worldbuilding, musical numbers, and themes, stating that "Alice's Wonderland Bakery mines author Lewis Carroll's treasure trove of source material and adds amazing sugary confections". Moulton did, however, express concern over the numerous desserts featured on the show and said there were many other types of foods Alice and her friends could cook. Marisa Lascala of Good Housekeeping included Alice's Wonderland Bakery in their "60 Best Kids' TV Shows and Family Series of All Time" list.

=== Accolades ===
Eden Espinosa received nominations for Best Voice-Over Actor (Television) and Outstanding Voice Performance in a Preschool Animated Program at the 2022 Imagen Awards and the 1st Children's and Family Emmy Awards, respectively.

== See also ==
- Alice in Wonderland (franchise)
- Alice's Adventures in Wonderland
- Butterbean's Café
- Through the Looking Glass
