= Alice in Wonderland (franchise) =

Disney media franchise based on the Alice books by Lewis Carroll

- Above: A logo used to represent the 1951 animated film Below: Logo used for the 2010 live-action film
- Created by: Walt Disney
- Original work: Alice in Wonderland (1951)
- Owner: The Walt Disney Company
- Years: 1951–2024
- Based on: Alice's Adventures in Wonderland and Through the Looking-Glass by Lewis Carroll

Films and television
- Films: Alice in Wonderland (1951; animated); Alice in Wonderland (2010; live-action); Alice Through the Looking Glass (2016)
- Television series: Adventures in Wonderland (1992–1995); Once Upon a Time in Wonderland (2013–2014)^{**}
- Animated series: Alice's Wonderland Bakery (2022–2024)

Theatrical presentations
- Play: Alice in Wonderland Jr.

Games
- Video games: Alice in Wonderland (2000); Alice in Wonderland (2010); Disney Infinity 3.0 (2015)^{*}

Audio
- Soundtracks: Alice in Wonderland (1951); Alice in Wonderland: An Original Walt Disney Records Soundtrack (2010); Alice Through the Looking Glass: Original Motion Picture Soundtrack (2016)
- Original music: Almost Alice (2010)

Miscellaneous
- Theme park attractions: Mad Tea Party (1955–present); Alice in Wonderland (1958–present); Alice's Curious Labyrinth (1992–present); Mad T Party (2012–2016)
- ^{*} Work where this franchise's characters or settings appeared as part of a crossover.; ^{**} Spin-off of TV series Once Upon a Time (2011–2018)

Alice in Wonderland, or simply Alice, is a Disney media franchise, commencing in 1951 with the theatrical release of the animated film Alice in Wonderland. The film is an adaptation of the books by Lewis Carroll, the 1865 novel Alice's Adventures in Wonderland and its 1871 sequel Through the Looking-Glass, which featured his character Alice. A live-action film directed by Tim Burton was released in 2010.

== Films ==
Film	U.S. release date	Director(s)	Screenwriter(s)	Story by	Producer(s)
Animated films
Alice in Wonderland	September 14, 1951	Clyde Geronimi, Wilfred Jackson & Hamilton Luske	Winston Hibler, Ted Sears, Bill Peet, Erdman Penner, Joe Rinaldi, Milt Banta, Bill Cottrell, Dick Kelsey, Joe Grant, Dick Huemer, Del Connell, Tom Oreb & John Walbridge		Walt Disney & Ben Sharpsteen
Live-action films
Alice in Wonderland	March 5, 2010	Tim Burton	Linda Woolverton	Linda Woolverton	Richard D. Zanuck, Joe Roth, Suzanne Todd & Jennifer Todd
Alice Through the Looking Glass	May 27, 2016	James Bobin	Linda Woolverton	Linda Woolverton	Joe Roth, Suzanne Todd, Jennifer Todd & Tim Burton

=== Animated films ===
==== Alice in Wonderland ====
Alice in Wonderland is a 1951 American animated fantasy comedy-adventure film produced by Walt Disney Productions and based primarily on Lewis Carroll's Alice's Adventures in Wonderland with several additional elements from his sequel, Through the Looking-Glass. The film was released in New York City and London on July 26, 1951, and features the voices of Kathryn Beaumont (who later voiced Wendy Darling in the 1953 film Peter Pan) as Alice, and Ed Wynn as the Mad Hatter. The theme song, "Alice in Wonderland", has since become a jazz standard.

=== Live-action films ===
==== Alice in Wonderland ====
Alice in Wonderland is a 2010 American fantasy film directed by Tim Burton and written by Linda Woolverton. Released by Walt Disney Pictures, the film stars Mia Wasikowska as Alice Kingsleigh, Johnny Depp, Anne Hathaway and Helena Bonham Carter. The film was shot in the United Kingdom and the United States.

==== Alice Through the Looking Glass ====
Alice Through the Looking Glass is a 2016 American fantasy film directed by James Bobin and written by Linda Woolverton. It is a sequel to the 2010 film Alice in Wonderland. The film stars Mia Wasikowska, Johnny Depp, Helena Bonham Carter, Anne Hathaway, Sacha Baron Cohen and Rhys Ifans, and was released on May 27, 2016.

== TV series ==
=== Adventures in Wonderland ===
Adventures in Wonderland is a live-action musical television series based on Walt Disney's animated film Alice in Wonderland that aired on The Disney Channel from 1992 to 1995. In the series, Alice (Elisabeth Harnois), was portrayed as a girl who can come and go from Wonderland simply by walking through her mirror (a reference to Wonderland's source material, Lewis Carroll's Through the Looking-Glass).

=== Once Upon a Time in Wonderland ===
Once Upon a Time in Wonderland is an American fantasy-drama series that aired on ABC from October 10, 2013, to April 3, 2014. It was created by Edward Kitsis, Adam Horowitz, Zack Estrin, and Jane Espenson for ABC Studios. Although not directly based on the Disney film, but primarily on the Lewis Carroll novels, it does include some elements inspired by the Disney version. The series is a spin-off of Once Upon a Time.

=== Alice's Wonderland Bakery ===
Alice's Wonderland Bakery is an American animated television series which is produced by Disney Television Animation that aired on Disney Junior from February 9, 2022, to April 15, 2024.

== Video games ==
=== Alice in Wonderland (2000) ===
Alice in Wonderland is a platform video game developed by Digital Eclipse Software and published by Nintendo for the Game Boy Color. It was released in North America on October 4, 2000. The game follows the plot of the 1951 animated film of the same name.

=== Kingdom Hearts series ===
Wonderland is a playable world in the Kingdom Hearts video game series, appearing for first time in the first Kingdom Hearts, and returns in Kingdom Hearts: Chain of Memories, Kingdom Hearts 358/2 Days, Kingdom Hearts coded as a digitized version of the world originating from data in Jiminy Cricket's royal journal, and Kingdom Hearts χ. Alice is also a major character in the overall plot of the first game due to her role as one of the seven Princesses of Heart. Other characters from the film who appear include the Queen of Hearts, the Cheshire Cat, the White Rabbit, the Doorknob, and the Card Soldiers. All except the Doorknob also appear in Chain of Memories as illusions made from Sora's memories. The Mad Hatter and the March Hare appear in portrait form as well, appearing in corporeal form in Kingdom Hearts χ, in addition to Tweedledee and Tweedledum. Caterpillar appears in the non-official game Kingdom Hearts V Cast, and also in the manga adaptation of Kingdom Hearts.

=== Alice in Wonderland (2010) ===
Alice in Wonderland is an action adventure video game published in 2010 by Disney Interactive Studios. The game can be used on Wii, Nintendo DS, Windows PC and Zeebo, with the soundtrack being composed by video game music composer Richard Jacques.

=== Disney Infinity series ===
The 1951 film was referenced throughout the Disney Infinity series with power discs and in-game toys released for the game. In May 2016, Alice, the Mad Hatter, and Time from Alice Through the Looking Glass were added to Disney Infinity 3.0. The three Alice characters were the penultimate additions to the series as Disney cancelled the Disney Infinity franchise earlier that month, with the Finding Dory playset and Dory and Nemo figures that were released the following month of June being the final releases.

=== Disney Magic Kingdoms ===
The world builder game Disney Magic Kingdoms includes the attraction Mad Tea Party since its launch on 17 March 2016. Alice's Curious Labyrinth also appears as part of the environment next to the Fantasyland area. During a limited time 2017 Event focused on Alice in Wonderland, were included Alice, White Rabbit, Mad Hatter, March Hare, Cheshire Cat, Queen of Hearts and Caterpillar as playable characters, along with the attractions Alice in Wonderland, The Golden Afternoon, The Tweedle's Wacky Fairway, and White Rabbit's House, with the characters involved in new storylines.

== Theme park attractions and rides ==
=== Alice in Wonderland Maze ===
A labyrinth opened on Shanghaî Disneyland on June 16, 2016, with the Park. It is based on Tim Burton's 2010 film.

=== Alice's Curious Labyrinth ===
Alice's Curious Labyrinth is a hedge maze attraction at the Disneyland Park within Disneyland Paris. It opened in 1992 with the Park, and belongs to the British part of Fantasyland.

=== Mad Tea Party ===
Mad Tea Party is a spinning tea cup ride at all five Disneyland-style theme parks. The ride theme is inspired by the Unbirthday Party scene in Alice In Wonderland. The ride has gained attention over the years for the number of people who get motion sickness as a result of the spinning component of the ride.

=== Alice in Wonderland (ride) ===
Alice in Wonderland is a dark ride in Fantasyland at Disneyland in Anaheim, California. Based on the animated adaptation of the same name, the attraction resides next to a second ride, the Mad Tea Party, based on a scene in that same adaptation. The presence of two rides based on the film is unusual in that Walt Disney said he regretted making it because it lacked a connection to the audience's hearts.

=== Mad T Party ===
Mad T Party is a show at Disney California Adventure which occurs in the Hollywood Studios subsection of the Hollywood Land section of the park. Mad T Party premiered on June 15, 2012, the same day the park was re-dedicated. The show is inspired by Tim Burton's Alice in Wonderland.

=== It's a Small World ===
It's a Small World is an Old Mill boat ride located in the Fantasyland area at various Disney theme parks around the world. The Disneyland and Tokyo Disneyland versions of It's a Small World featured Alice and White Rabbit in the England scene since 2009 (in Disneyland) and 2018 (in Tokyo Disneyland).

== Stage versions ==
=== Alice in Wonderland Jr. ===
Alice in Wonderland Jr. is a one-act stage version intended for middle and high school productions. It includes the majority of the film's songs and three new numbers entitled "Ocean of Tears", "Simon Says," and "Who Are You?" The musical originally featured Song of the South's "Zip-a-Dee-Doo-Dah," but the song was later removed amid concerns that it could be found offensive by some audiences. This 60-/80-minute version is owned by Music Theatre International in the Broadway, Jr. Collection.

=== Touring Productions ===
Alice in Wonderland has often been featured as a segment of the touring Disney on Ice productions, including in Let's Celebrate and Disneyland Aventure. The film also inspired a segment in Disney Live! Mickey's Magic Show.

== Music ==
=== Alice in Wonderland soundtrack ===
Alice in Wonderland was first released on LP record on July 28, 1951, and re-released on Audio CD in 1998.

=== Almost Alice ===
Almost Alice is a concept album of various artists' music inspired by Burton's Alice in Wonderland. The album is also notable for featuring songs that were inspired from quotes directly from Lewis Carroll's original novel. The album was released by Buena Vista Records on March 2, 2010. It debuted at number five on the Billboard 200.
