= Caterpillar (Alice's Adventures in Wonderland) =

Fictional character in 1865 novel

- Alice character
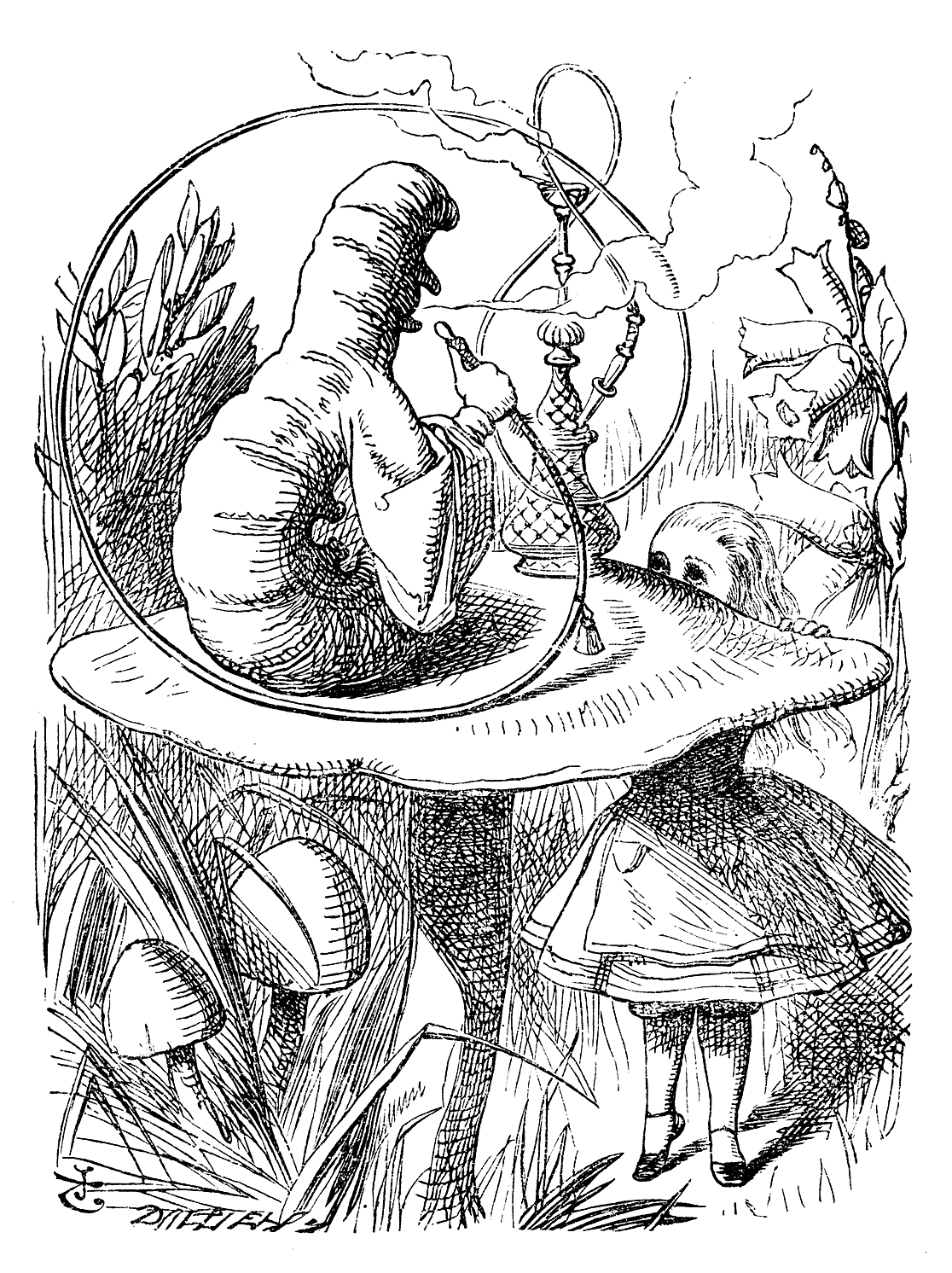
- The Caterpillar using a hookah; an illustration by John Tenniel. The illustration is noted for its ambiguous central figure, whose head can be viewed as being a human male's face with a pointed nose and protruding chin or being the head end of an actual caterpillar, with two "true" legs visible.
- First appearance: Alice's Adventures in Wonderland
- Created by: Lewis Carroll

In-universe information
- Aliases: Hookah-Smoking Caterpillar, Absolem (Tim Burton movies)
- Nickname: The Blue Caterpillar
- Species: Caterpillar
- Gender: Male
- Nationality: Wonderland

The Caterpillar (also known as the Hookah-Smoking Caterpillar or the Blue Caterpillar) is a fictional character appearing in Lewis Carroll's 1865 book Alice's Adventures in Wonderland.

== In the book ==
Introduced in Chapter Four ("Rabbit Sends in a Little Bill") and the main center of interest of Chapter V ("Advice from a Caterpillar"), the Caterpillar is a hookah-smoking caterpillar exactly 3 inches (7.6 cm) high (a height, the virtues of which, he defends against Alice's complaint). Alice does not like the Caterpillar when they first meet, because he does not immediately talk to her and when he does, it is usually in short, rather rude sentences, or difficult questions.

The original illustration by John Tenniel is something of a visual paradox, wherein the caterpillar's human face appears to be formed from the head and legs of a naturalistic caterpillar.

== In other media ==
The Caterpillar makes an appearance in many other works since Alice's Adventures in Wonderland:

=== Disney film ===
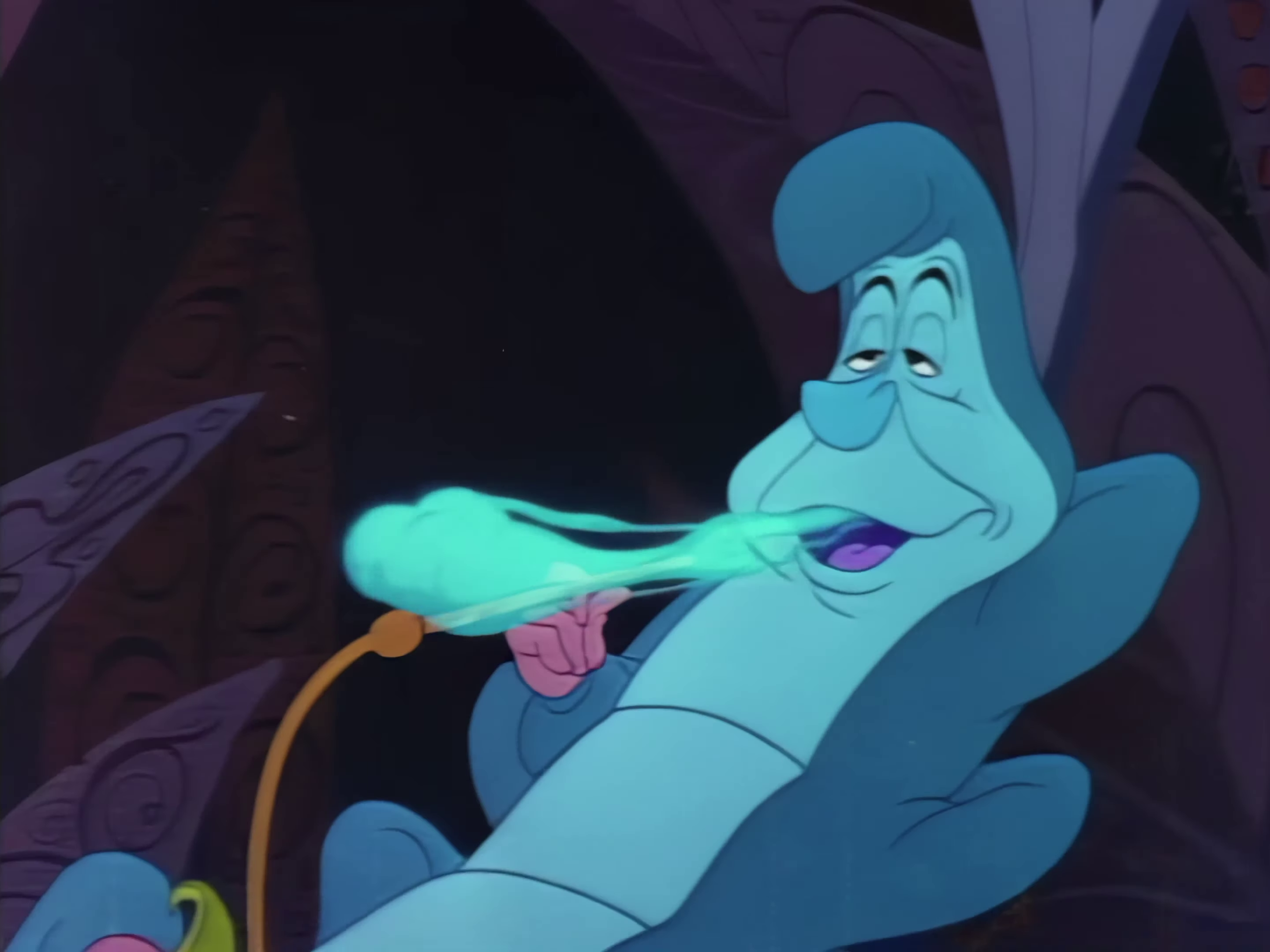
The Caterpillar as he appears in the 1951 animated film.

In the 1951 Disney animated film, the Caterpillar is a blue creature who, as in the original Tenniel illustration, smokes a hookah. He is seen as a very forthright character as he yells at Alice quite often during the scenes in which they both appear. He blows smoke in Alice's face and when she needs assistance he ignores her. He is a quite mean character providing little to no assistance to Alice and ends up confusing her more while she is trapped in Wonderland. He then ignores her and turns into a butterfly and flutters away not caring whether or not Alice makes it out alive. He also instructs her to eat a mushroom but does not say what it does thus putting her into possible danger. He reappears one final time during the ending chase, still in butterfly form but once again smoking on his hookah, and again ignoring Alice when she asks for his help escaping the Queen of Hearts.

His memorable phrase is a breathy "Whooo ... are ... you?", this line is visualised as exhalations of smoke in the shapes "O", "R" and "U". Alice remarks in the original that the Caterpillar will one day turn into a butterfly, and in this version he does so in Alice's presence. He is voiced by Richard Haydn in the 1951 film, while Corey Burton voices the character in other media since 2001.

=== Tim Burton films ===
Alan Rickman voices the Caterpillar, who in this adaptation is named Absolem. Rickman was filmed while recording his voice in a studio, but his face was not composited onto the character's face as originally planned.

He appears five times in the movie. The first time is outside Wonderland, when a young man named Hamish Ascot is about to propose to Alice and she notices a blue caterpillar on his shoulder. The second time is when Nivens McTwisp the White Rabbit, Tweedledum and Tweedledee, Mallymkun the Dormouse, and the Uilleam the Dodo consider Alice's identity, and they consult him. Absolem appears in a thick cloud of hookah smoke, which he blows at Alice. He appears again after Alice arrives at the White Queen's Castle, and again to remind Alice of her previous visit to Wonderland. He blows smoke at her twice this time, and Alice asks him to stop it. At the end of the movie, Absolem, as a butterfly, appears on Alice's shoulder as she sets off for China.

Rickman reprises the role in Alice Through the Looking Glass (2016), though he remains a butterfly, leading Alice to the looking-glass portal to Underland and informing her that matters require her urgent attention. He isn't seen again for the rest of the film but makes a cameo in the credits. This was also Rickman's final film performance and the film is dedicated in his memory.

=== Once Upon a Time ===
The Caterpillar appears in the episode "Hat Trick" of the television series Once Upon a Time, voiced by Roger Daltrey. In the 2013 spin-off series Once Upon a Time in Wonderland, the Caterpillar appears in the episode "Forget Me Not" voiced by Iggy Pop, wherein he operates a meeting-house for the transaction of criminal business. He is consulted twice by Alice for assistance in an adventure of her own.

=== In other media ===
- In several Marvel Comics stories featuring Doctor Strange, the magical entity Agamotto has appeared in a form resembling the Caterpillar.
- The Caterpillar is referenced in the 1967 song White Rabbit by Jefferson Airplane.
- The Caterpillar appeared in the 2000 video game American McGee's Alice and its 2011 sequel Alice Madness Returns, voiced by Jarion Monroe. He is the wisest denizen in Wonderland and provides guidance to Alice in both games.
- In one episode of Ouran High School Host Club called "Haruhi in Wonderland", Kyoya Otori is dressed as the Caterpillar.
- In the 2003 horror crossover film Freddy vs. Jason, Freddy Krueger takes the form of the Caterpillar and smokes a hookah in Freeburg's dream.
- The Caterpillar appeared in the 2004 novel The Looking-Glass Wars and he plays the role of an oracle.
- The Caterpillar makes a cameo appearance in the Sunsoft's 2006 mobile game Alice's Warped Wonderland (歪みの国のアリス, Yugami no kuni no Arisu; Alice in Distortion World). The Caterpillar appears only in one scenario branch of the bad endings, warning Ariko (the "Alice" of the game) that Cheshire Cat has become dangerous, but is shortly squished to death by Cheshire Cat. The Caterpillar takes the form of a miniature human man in a green sleeping bag.
- In the 2009 SyFy TV miniseries Alice, the character is a human nicknamed "Caterpillar" (Harry Dean Stanton), who is the leader of the underground resistance to the Queen of Hearts.
- In the Murdoch Mysteries TV show 2011 episode “Murdoch in Wonderland,” the titular character is framed for murder following an Alice in Wonderland themed costume party. The host, Constance Gardenier, dresses herself as the Caterpillar.
- In the Ensemble Stars! DRAMATICA ACT 3 stage production "カラ降るワンダフル！", Madara Mikejima is portraying the Caterpillar.
- In the 2025 Russian musical film Alice in Wonderland, the Caterpillar is portrayed by Sergey Burunov.
