= King of Hearts (Alice's Adventures in Wonderland) =

The King of Hearts
- Alice character
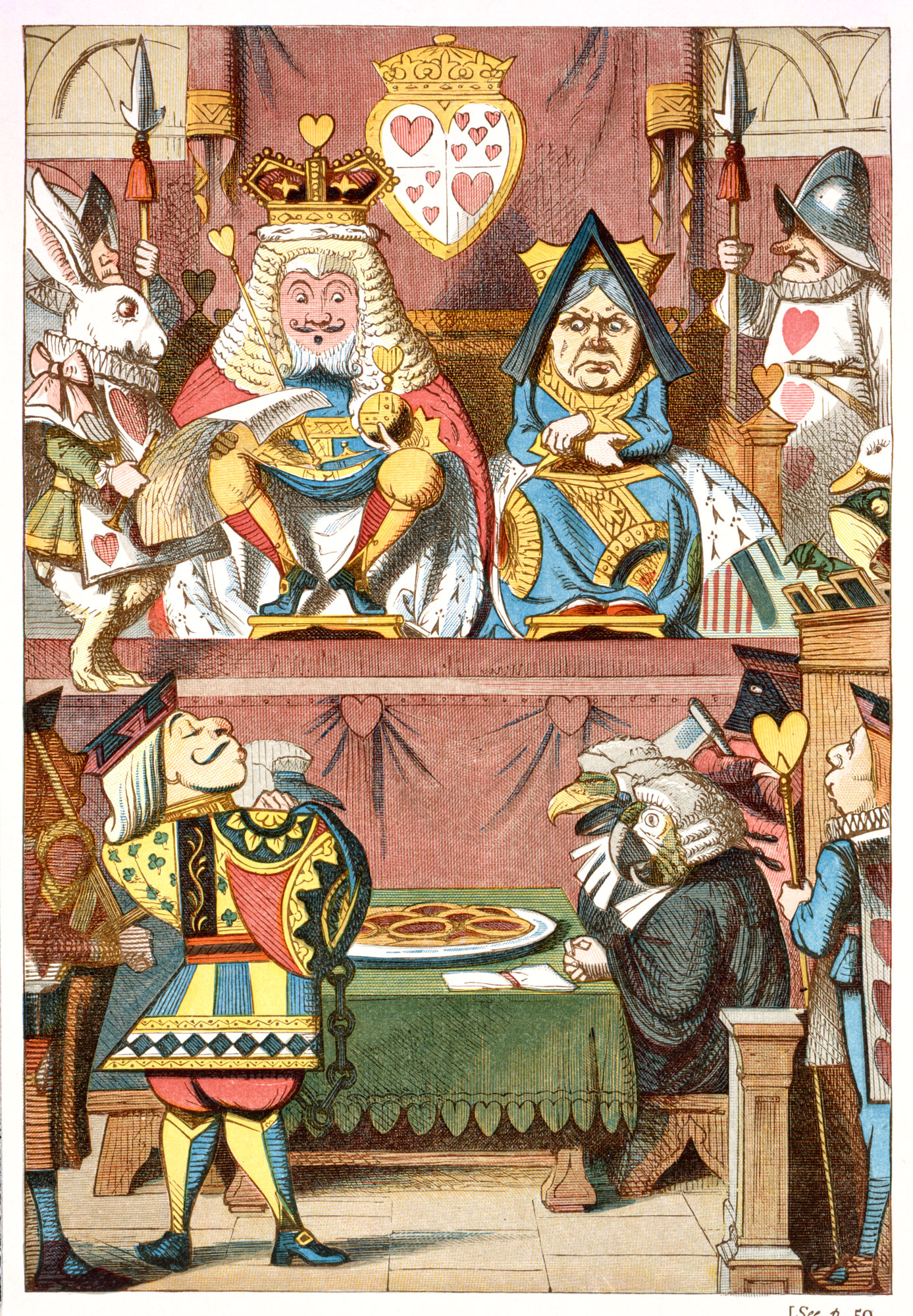
- John Tenniel's illustration of the King and Queen of Hearts at the trial of the Knave of Hearts.
- First appearance: Alice's Adventures in Wonderland
- Created by: Lewis Carroll

In-universe information
- Species: Playing card
- Gender: Male
- Occupation: King
- Spouse: Queen of Hearts
- Children: Ten Hearts
- Nationality: Wonderland

The King of Hearts is a character from the 1865 book Alice's Adventures in Wonderland by Lewis Carroll. He is the husband of the Queen of Hearts.

== Alice's Adventures in Wonderland ==
When compared to the Queen of Hearts, the King of Hearts appears to be the moderate part of the Wonderland government. As an example, when the Queen, who enjoys ordering beheadings, attempts to have Alice executed (charged with being unable to answer who is lying down in front of her), the King of Hearts reminds her that she is only a child.

The King also quietly pardons many of the subjects the Queen has ordered to be beheaded when the Queen is not looking. This guarantees few people are actually guillotined. Nevertheless, when the Queen plays a game of croquet in the story, the only players who remain at the end are himself, the Queen, and Alice.

At the Knave of Hearts' trial, however, where he acts as judge, he is revealed to be quite juvenile, with such lines as, "don't be nervous or I'll have you executed on the spot" to the Mad Hatter, or asking the Duchess's cook irrelevant questions, such as "what are tarts made of?" Between the two of them, the King and Queen appear to present a fairly accurate reflection of the childish, reckless, and confusing world of Wonderland.

== Disney version ==
The King of Hearts
- Disney's Alice in Wonderland character
- First appearance: Alice in Wonderland (1951)
- Voiced by: Dink Trout (1951); Tony Pope (Disneyland attraction)

In-universe information
- Gender: Male
- Spouse: Queen of Hearts
- Relatives: Valentina Corazón (possible descendant; in Alice's Wonderland Bakery); Rosa Corazón (possible descendant; in Alice's Wonderland Bakery)

The Disney animated film portrays the King of Hearts as a dwarfish man wearing an extremely tall crown, and he is very much subdued by the Queen in terms of popularity among their subjects. He seems to be less bright than in the book: for instance when he first sees Alice, he thinks she is another card. He also squeals happily behind the subject being ordered to be beheaded, once the Queen gives the order, taunting the Card guards that are carrying away the failed Card Soldier as if he had given the order himself. He appears briefly when the Cheshire Cat entangles the Queen's croquet mallet (actually a live flamingo) in her dress, causing her to fall over and expose her red heart-printed bloomers. The King then gives the order to save her modesty, which he and nearly all the Card Soldiers do with the sole exception of Alice. This causes the Queen to blame Alice for the embarrassing situation. Just as she orders Alice's head off, the King of Hearts requests a trial beforehand. This irritates the Queen, prompting the King to add that it will only be "a little trial".

The Queen accepts. However, when the trial begins she offers an atypical approach towards justice: sentence before verdict (the same stance taken by her original portrayal in the book with regard to the Knave of Hearts). The King again stops her, saying they should call witnesses first. The witnesses called are the Mad Hatter, March Hare, and Dormouse whom Alice met earlier. The Cheshire Cat reappears and frightens the Dormouse, who briefly puts the court into disorder. The Queen of Hearts again blames Alice for it, and orders her beheaded. At this, Alice eats mushrooms she had earlier procured, which make her grow bigger. Although the King announces rule #42 which says that "all persons more than a mile high must leave the court immediately", Alice feels free to call the Queen a "fat, pompous, bad-tempered old tyrant" while growing to her new size. When Alice returns to normal size and the Cheshire Cat mentions the insult again enough for the Queen of Hearts to quote "Off With her Head." The Queen gives the order a third time. As Alice flees, the King uses his oversized crown as a megaphone to tell the guards to "do as her Majesty says". The King of Hearts partakes in the chase on Alice amongst the Queen of Hearts, the Card Soldiers, and the other Wonderland characters. This ends when Alice wakes up.

He was voiced by Dink Trout in the 1951 film and by Tony Pope in the Disneyland attraction.

== Other versions ==
- In the 1933 film Alice in Wonderland, he was portrayed by Ford Sterling.
- In the 1972 film Alice's Adventures in Wonderland, he is portrayed by Dennis Price.
- The 2009 TV miniseries Alice presents the King of Hearts, here named Winston Heart, as an unhappy character married to Mary Elizabeth Constance De Villiers Heart, the Queen of Wonderland. Although he loves her dearly, she cares only for power. As in other versions, Winston finds ways of mitigating the lethality of his wife's orders. In the end, he decides to die in their collapsing palace; wistfully telling his wife "I would have taken over the world for just one smile".
- In the ABC TV drama Once Upon a Time, the closest analog to the King of Hearts is the character of Henry (portrayed by Tony Perez), the footman and father of the Evil Queen, in that his wife, Cora (the miller's daughter from Rumpelstiltskin), becomes the Queen of Hearts after being exiled to Wonderland.
- The anime and manga series Pandora Hearts has Arthur Barma, the brother of Miranda Barma/Demios who was based on the Queen of Hearts.
