= Dormouse (Alice's Adventures in Wonderland character) =

Character in Alice's Adventures in Wonderland

- Alice character
- The Hatter with the Dormouse asleep on the left. Illustration by John Tenniel.
- First appearance: Alice's Adventures in Wonderland
- Created by: Lewis Carroll

In-universe information
- Species: Dormouse
- Gender: Male
- Nationality: Wonderland

The Dormouse is a character in "A Mad Tea-Party", Chapter VII of the 1865 novel Alice's Adventures in Wonderland by Lewis Carroll.

== History ==
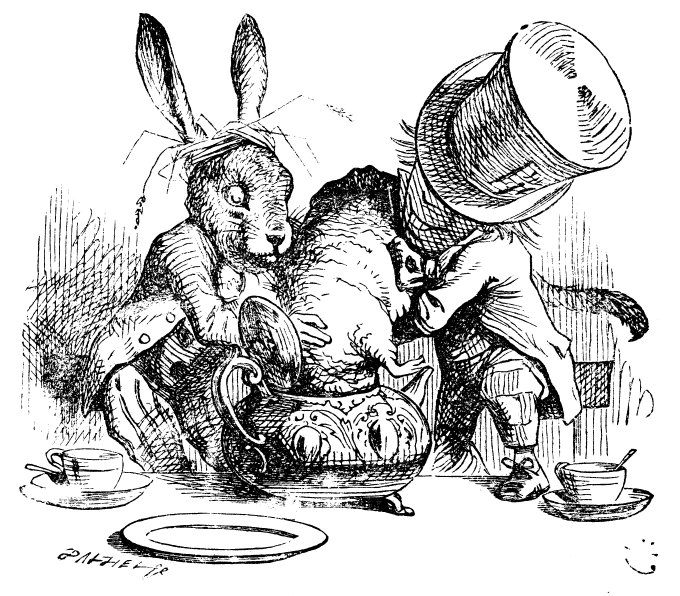
The March Hare and the Hatter put the Dormouse's head in a teapot. Illustration by John Tenniel.

The Dormouse sat between the March Hare and the Mad Hatter. They were using him as a cushion while he slept when Alice arrives at the start of the chapter.

The Dormouse is always falling asleep during the scene, waking up every so often, for example to say:

'You might just as well say,' added the Dormouse, who seemed to be talking in his sleep, that "I breathe when I sleep" is the same thing as "I sleep when I breathe"!'

He also tells a story about three young sisters who live in a treacle well, live on treacle, and draw pictures of things beginning with 'M', such as mousetraps, memory and muchness.

He later appears, equally sleepy, at the Knave of Hearts' trial and voices resentment at Alice for growing. His last interaction with any character is his being "suppressed" (amongst other things) by the Queen for shouting out that tarts are made of treacle.

== Disney version ==
The Dormouse
- Disney's Alice in Wonderland character
- First appearance: Alice in Wonderland (1951)
- Voiced by: Jimmy MacDonald

In-universe information
- Species: Dormouse
- Gender: Male
- Occupation: Mad tea party entertainer
- Nationality: Wonderland

A version of the character appears in Disney's animated film Alice in Wonderland. As in the book, he is sleepy and lazy, but unlike in the book, he sings Twinkle, Twinkle, Little Bat instead of telling his story about mouse sisters to entertain the tea-party participants.

He panics at the mention of the word "cat", much like The Mouse from the book, and needs to have jam spread on his nose in order to calm down. This first happens when Alice talks about her cat Dinah, causing the March Hare and the Mad Hatter to chase after it in order to administer the jam.

The Dormouse later appears as the second witness at Alice's trial, where two playing cards had to have the Queen of Hearts question it quietly and he once again sings Twinkle, Twinkle, Little Bat. When Alice points out that the Cheshire Cat is on the Queen of Hearts' crown, the Queen of Hearts quotes "cat", causing the Dormouse to panic, with the March Hare, the Mad Hatter, and the King of Hearts running around trying to catch him, with comical results.

The Disney version of the character also appears in the television series House of Mouse and its direct-to-video film Mickey's Magical Christmas: Snowed in at the House of Mouse.

Disney's Dormouse also appears as a playable character to unlock for a limited time in the video game Disney Magic Kingdoms.

== Tim Burton's version ==
Mallymkun, the Dormouse
- Alice in Wonderland character
- First appearance: Alice in Wonderland (2010)
- Voiced by: Barbara Windsor

In-universe information
- Nickname: Mally
- Species: Mouse
- Gender: Female
- Occupation: Swordfighter
- Nationality: Underland/Wonderland

In Tim Burton's 2010 Alice in Wonderland film, the Dormouse is a small, female mouse named Mallymkun. Unlike the sleepy character in the book, this Dormouse is an action-oriented sword fighter in training similar to the character Reepicheep from The Chronicles of Narnia. She is voiced by Barbara Windsor.

She is initially seen with the group Alice first meets in Wonderland, and saving Alice from the Bandersnatch by plucking out its eye. She is seen a second time at March Hare's tea party, having tea with the March Hare and the Mad Hatter.

She is seen a third time rescuing the Hatter from the Red Queen. She is seen a fourth time at the end, fighting the Red Queen's forces. She also appears in the movie's 2016 sequel in the beginning when Alice returns to Wonderland, and later when Time travels back to the past and encounters her, the Hatter and the March Hare having a tea party, which he curses to last forever after he realizes they are stalling him.

Mallymkun appears as a playable character in the video game adaptation of Alice in Wonderland.

The Dormouse appears as a member of the Mad T Party band at Disneyland's California Adventure Park. In the Mad T Party he is interpreted as a male rather than the 2010 film's female Mallymkun, who he is based on. He plays lead guitar and often scurries around with the March Hare on stage.

== In other media ==
- The Dormouse beckons to "Feed Your Head" in Grace Slick's song "White Rabbit", recorded in 1966 by Jefferson Airplane on the Surrealistic Pillow album.
- The Dormouse is played by Arte Johnson in the 1985 television film Alice in Wonderland. When he initially shows lack of movement at the mad tea party, Alice mistakes him for a stuffed animal. The Dormouse then quickly objects to Alice's statements.
- The Dormouse appears in the live-action television series Adventures in Wonderland, and is voiced by John Lovelady. He isn't sleepy, and is often seen popping out of his tea pot or other things. In one episode, he is the announcer of a sprinting event.
- The Dormouse was portrayed by Dudley Moore in the 1972 British musical film Alice's Adventures in Wonderland.
- The Dormouse appears in the 1985 film Dreamchild performed by Karen Prell and voiced by Julie Walters.
- The Dormouse appeared in Sunsoft's 2006 mobile game Alice's Warped Wonderland (歪みの国のアリス, Yugami no kuni no Arisu; Alice in Distortion World). While prone to falling asleep, Dormouse tries to be helpful to Ariko (the game's "Alice") and treats her gently. In one of the bad endings, Dormouse is killed by a twisted Cheshire Cat.
- The Dormouse makes an appearance in the video game American McGee's Alice, where he and the March Hare are held captive as the Mad Hatter's experimental subjects. He is tied to a dissection table and continues to fall asleep from the Hatter's medicines.
  - The Dormouse appears again in the 2011 sequel Alice: Madness Returns, where he and the March Hare betray and dismantle the Mad Hatter as revenge for the events in American McGee's Alice and use his domain to construct the Infernal Train for the Dollmaker's plan to purge Wonderland.
- Black Butler, in the 2012 OVA Ciel in Wonderland, Ronald Knox is the dormouse.
- The Dormouse appears in the 2012 musical Alice by Heart, his first (and only) appearance bring in the song "Sick to Death of Alice-ness"
- In the SyFy miniseries Alice, the Dormouse, portrayed by Nancy Robertson is a sidekick of the Hatter.
- In the manga and anime series Pandora Hearts, Dormouse is a chain that puts people to sleep and Vincent Nightray is its contractor.
- The Dormouse was referenced in the fantasy series Once Upon a Time in Wonderland, a spin-off of Once Upon a Time. In the pilot episode, the White Rabbit misled Alice and the Knave of Hearts in saying that, while having tea with the Dormouse, he learned that Alice's true love Cyrus was alive. In reality, he received this information from the Red Queen.
- In the 2025 Russian musical film Alice in Wonderland, the Dormouse is female (as the Russian word for dormouse, соня, is of feminine gender) and is portrayed by Alina Dotsenko.

== Cultural references ==
The Dormouse's foremost recognition in popular culture stems from the American rock band Jefferson Airplane's song "White Rabbit", which dramatically repeats the line: "Remember what the dormouse said: feed your head, feed your head". The cadence of this enigmatic lyric has inspired references over the next century, including the title of John Markoff's 2005 book, What the Dormouse Said: How the 60s Counterculture Shaped the Personal Computer Industry, and sung by Nixon's Head in the Futurama episode "A Head in the Polls".
