= White Rabbit =

Fictional character by Lewis Carroll

- Alice character
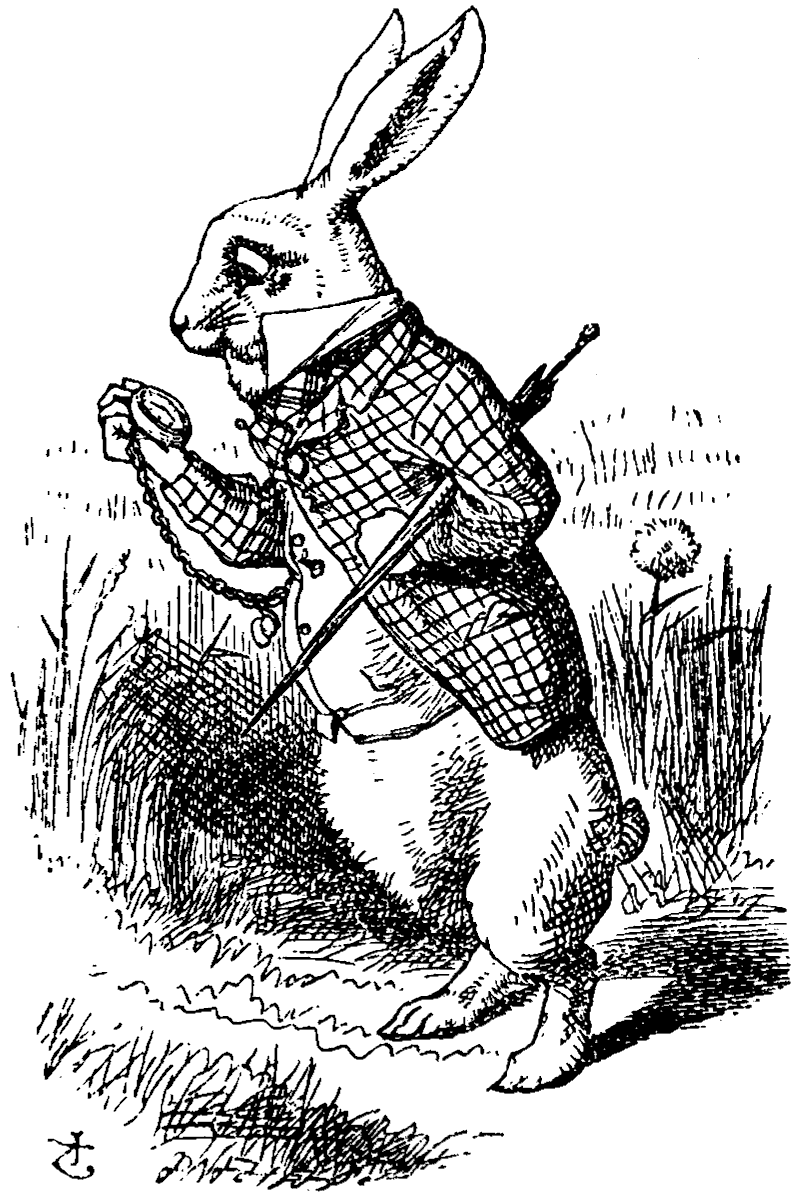
- First appearance: Alice's Adventures in Wonderland
- Created by: Lewis Carroll

In-universe information
- Nickname: The White Rabbit
- Species: European rabbit
- Gender: Male
- Occupation: Page
- Nationality: Wonderland

The White Rabbit is a fictional anthropomorphic rabbit who appears as a key character in Lewis Carroll's 1865 book Alice's Adventures in Wonderland. He is depicted as a hurried, waistcoat-clad lagomorph who perpetually consults his pocket watch and mutters of his tardiness as he scurries about in his duties. His appearance and behaviour incite the protagonist Alice to pursue him down a rabbit hole, initiating her journey into Wonderland. Alice encounters him again when he mistakes her for his housemaid Mary Ann and she becomes trapped in his house after growing too large. In the last few chapters, he appears as a herald and footman to the King and Queen of Hearts. The White Rabbit has been depicted in numerous adaptations, including Disney's 1951 and 2010 films.

== Personality ==
Alice meeting the Rabbit

In his article "Alice on the Stage", Carroll wrote, "And the White Rabbit, what of him? Was he framed on the 'Alice' lines, or meant as a contrast? As a contrast, distinctly. For her 'youth', 'audacity', 'vigour', and 'swift directness of purpose', read 'elderly', 'timid', 'feeble', and 'nervously shilly-shallying', and you will get something of what I meant him to be. I think the White Rabbit should wear spectacles. I'm sure his voice should quaver, and his knees quiver and his whole air suggest a total inability to say 'Boo' to a goose!"

Overall, the White Rabbit seems to shift back and forth between pompous behaviour toward his underlings, such as his servants, and grovelling, obsequious behaviour toward his superiors, such as the Duchess, and the King and Queen of Hearts, in direct contrast to Alice, who is reasonably polite to everyone she meets.

The White Rabbit's perennial unpunctuality is a nod to Oxford time, the tradition at Oxford (and especially Christ Church, where Carroll taught) of having events begin five minutes past the scheduled hour.

== Adaptations and in popular culture ==
=== Disney film ===
White Rabbit
- Disney character
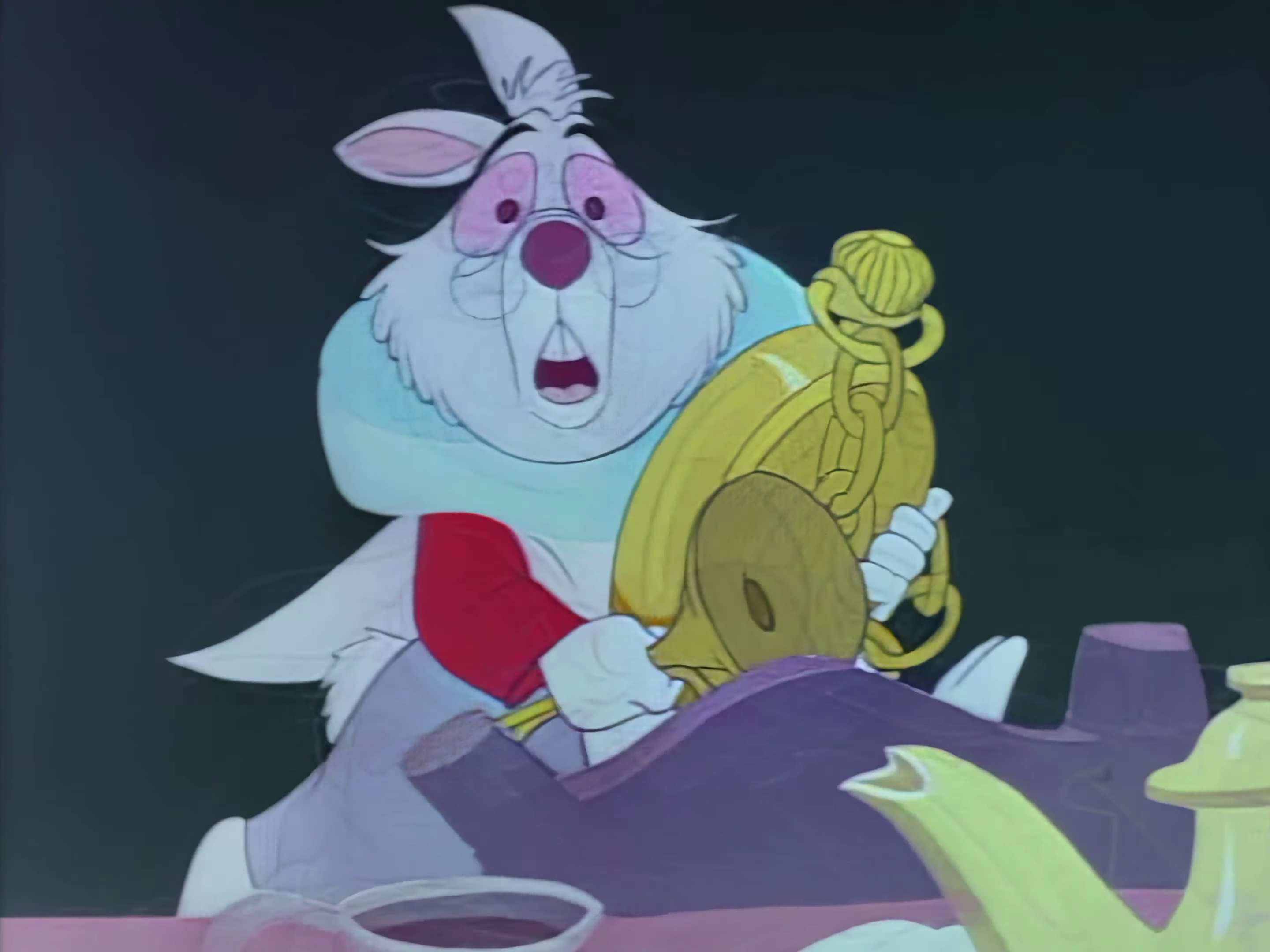
- First appearance: Alice in Wonderland (1951)
- Created by: Walt Disney
- Voiced by: Bill Thompson (original film); Corey Burton (House of Mouse, Kingdom Hearts, 1984-2003); Jeff Bennett (Kinect: Disneyland Adventures, 2011-present); Shigeru Ushiyama (Japanese, Kingdom Hearts series)

In-universe information
- Species: Rabbit
- Gender: Male
- Occupation: Page
- Nationality: Wonderland

Disney's animated version of the Rabbit is perhaps best known for the little song he sings on his first appearance, "I'm late! I'm late! For a very important date! No time to say hello, goodbye! I'm late! I'm late! I'm late!". His initial panicky behaviour is presumably because he is late for the royal garden party where he is due to act as herald; this would be quite enough for him to lose his head to the touchy Queen.

He is often the straight man for other characters' zany antics; when he asks the Dodo for help on getting the "monster" (Alice) out of his house, Dodo's ultimate solution is to burn the house down, to which the White Rabbit is greatly opposed. At the Mad Tea Party, the Mad Hatter and the March Hare try to "fix" his watch, proclaiming it "exactly two days slow," and eventually destroy it in their efforts to correct it.

The Rabbit was voiced by Bill Thompson.

The White Rabbit appears at the Walt Disney Parks and Resorts as a meetable character.

In Aladdin and the King of Thieves, the Genie was transformed into him.

The White Rabbit made a few appearances on the Disney Channel original show, House of Mouse. His most notable appearance was in the episode "Clarabelle's Big Secret" when he confessed to Clarabelle Cow that "I'm not really late, and I don't really have a date. I'm a fraud!". He is seen being grabbed by the reservation clerk Daisy Duck in the show's intro. He was voiced by Corey Burton, who has voiced the Rabbit in all English speaking roles for the character since then until in Kinect: Disneyland Adventures, where his voice was provided by Jeff Bennett.

In the PlayStation 2 action-RPG game Kingdom Hearts and its Game Boy Advance follow-up, Kingdom Hearts: Chain of Memories, the White Rabbit leads Sora, Donald Duck and Goofy to the Queen's palace, worried about being late. His Japanese voice actor was Shigeru Ushiyama.

In The Simpsons short Plusaversary, Disney's White Rabbit made a brief appearance in Moe's Tavern.

In the television series Alice's Wonderland Bakery, the White Rabbit's great-grandson Fergie is one of the main characters. In the episode "Potato Potahto", the White Rabbit appears in a photograph.

The White Rabbit has a cameo appearance in the short film Once Upon a Studio (2023), as part of the Walt Disney Animation Studios characters who gather to take a group photo.

=== Švankmajer film ===
In the 1988 Czechoslovak film Alice, the White Rabbit appears as a taxidermied specimen that breaks out of a glass case in Alice's room. The character is animated via stop-motion and is depicted leaking sawdust through a hole in its chest. During Alice's pursuit of the White Rabbit in Wonderland, he physically attacks her with paddles, a hacksaw, and a group of skeletal animals. The White Rabbit is also the Queen of Hearts' executioner, using scissors to behead the Mad Hatter, the March Hare, and other characters. Upon awakening from her dream and finding the White Rabbit missing from his case, Alice finds his scissors and resolves to behead him herself.

=== Tim Burton film ===
Nivens McTwisp, The White Rabbit
- Alice character
- First appearance: Alice in Wonderland
- Created by: Lewis Carroll; Tim Burton
- Voiced by: Michael Sheen

In-universe information
- Full name: Nivens McTwisp
- Nickname: The White Rabbit
- Species: Rabbit
- Gender: Male
- Occupation: Page
- Nationality: Underland

The White Rabbit works for the Red Queen, but is also a secret member of the Underland Underground Resistance, and was sent by the Hatter to search for Alice. Actor Michael Sheen stated, "The White Rabbit is such an iconic character that I didn't feel like I should break the mould too much." In this film adaptation, the White Rabbit is given the name Nivens McTwisp.

McTwisp appears in the video game adaptation of Tim Burton's Alice in Wonderland as a playable character. He attacks using his watch and can manipulate time.

=== Other films ===
- In Jurassic Park, the character of Dennis Nedry writes a computer program to disable security systems of the park and hide his steps. Samuel L. Jackson's character finds a file called "Whte_rbt.obj" that he claims did it all.
- In The Matrix, there are several metaphysical "waking up" metaphors that reference the Wonderland stories. Early in the film, Neo is told to follow the "White Rabbit" and seconds later, his doorbell rings, and when he opens the door he finds a woman with a tattoo of a white rabbit on her shoulder. Later in the film, Morpheus offers him the "red pill" to "find out just how deep the rabbit hole goes". Right before he meets the Oracle one can see Night of the Lepus playing on a nearby television, symbolising Neo's decision to "follow the white rabbit" and to disturb the order of the Matrix.
- In Pacific Rim, there are several metaphysical "waking up" metaphors that reference the Wonderland stories. In the film, Mako Mori is instructed during "mind-meld" training to "do not latch onto memories; let them wash over you" and to above all never follow the "White Rabbit". Later in the film, she does this and nearly kills military staff members.
- In Aladdin and the King of Thieves, Genie briefly transforms into the White Rabbit and even quotes his famous line of "I'm late, I'm late, for a very important date!". Genie was late announcing the arrival of the bride and groom for Jasmine and Aladdin's wedding, realizing that the guests have already been seated.
- In Knowing, the character of John Koestler Nicolas Cage's character decodes a prophesy of an Extinction Level Event / End Times. His young son, Caleb, and the young granddaughter of the prophet, Abby, are taken at the conclusion by Angelic "Alien" beings aboard an Arc to save them (and others deemed fit) from Earth's destruction. Abby is holding her pet White Rabbit as they ascend into the Arc.
- In Little Nicky (2000), the character of Little Nicky Adam Sandler's character as son of the Devil fights his siblings who have brought hell on Earth, and having an Angelic mother, fires rainbow beams from his fingers that produce white rabbits, during the act of fighting evil demons using "the power of good".
- The White Rabbit is voiced by Mackenzie Crook in the 2024 animated movie The Night Before Christmas in Wonderland.
- In the 2025 Russian musical film Alice in Wonderland, the White Rabbit is portrayed by Andrey Fedortsov.

=== Television ===
- The White Rabbit appears in the Once Upon a Time spin-off called Once Upon a Time in Wonderland voiced by John Lithgow - in this show, his first name is revealed to be Percy. He helps the Knave of Hearts to free Alice from Bethlem Royal Hospital in a Victorian Era-type world and bring her back to Wonderland. The Red Queen is also forcing the White Rabbit to be her ears in order to find out about Alice's plans.
- In Star Trek, the 1966 episode "Shore Leave" shows the protagonists visiting a planet where characters of their imagination come to life. The White Rabbit appears to Doctor McCoy early in the episode.
- In Star Trek: The Animated Series, in the episode "Once Upon a Planet" the White Rabbit appears before Alice shows up chasing him.
- The White Rabbit appeared in the "Brooke Shields" episode of The Muppet Show performed by Steve Whitmire. The White Rabbit puppet later made a cameo in the wedding scene of The Muppets Take Manhattan, an episode of Donna's Day, and episode 4081 of Sesame Street (where its ears were in the downward position).
- In the Syfy Alice, The White Rabbit is a secret organisation that works for the Queen of Hearts and abducts people from the real world, so they can gamble in the Queen's casino. The actual character is represented by a member of the organisation called Agent White who kidnaps Jack (Alice's fiancé, the Jack of Hearts) and tries to retrieve a magic ring called the Stone of Wonderland from Alice. When it is found out that he failed his mission, the Queen has him executed.
- In Lost, the White Rabbit has alluded to several times in the series. First, it is the name of an episode, and Locke claims that Jack is chasing the White Rabbit in the form of his father. The White Rabbit is also the symbol for the Looking Glass Station and it is also carrying a clock with it.
- In Leverage Season 5, the White Rabbit is mentioned in episode 12 as being the main title and con of the episode.

=== Literature ===
- In The Looking-Glass Wars, the White Rabbit is re-imagined as Bibwit Harte (an anagram of "White Rabbit"), an albino tutor with super-sensitive hearing.
- In the manga series Alice in the Country of Hearts, written by Quinrose and published by Tokyopop, a character named Peter White is the prime minister of the castle of hearts. He is portrayed as a cruel man who would kill anyone in an instant. He has little in common with the image of the white rabbit other than white rabbit ears, a large oversized pocketwatch, and a suit. He is desperately in love with Alice and often caught rhyming as he speaks. Alice does mention hating him on several occasions and claims to hate "White Rabbit ears" the most.
- In the Stephen King novel The Long Walk, a boy named Stebbins refers to himself as "the White Rabbit type."
- In the manga Pandora Hearts the main character Oz Vessalius is based in the White Rabbit as he is the chain B-Rabbit.
- In the manga series Project ARMS a boy infected with intelligent nano machines code named white rabbit is granted superior speed and jumping ability.
- In the book Boy in a White Room (among other Alice in Wonderland references) the main character gets send hints through pictures of a “White Rabbit” that are visible in live footage he has access to.
- In the third volume of Shazam!, the White Rabbit is an inhabitant of the Magiclands location called Wozenderlands. He was seen carrying the Tin Man's axe to give to Dorothy while evading the wrongful advice of the talking trees. When the winged monkeys that worked for the Wicked Witches of the North, South, East, and West pursue him, the White Rabbit is saved by Mamaragan, Eugene Choi, and Pedro Peña. Afterwards, Mamaragan asks where Alice is. The White Rabbit then accompanies them to meet up with Alice and Dorothy Gale. As the group roasts apples and cucumbers at the campfire later that night, the White Rabbit learns of Eugene and Pedro's trip through the Funlands and the Gamelands. When everyone meets up in the Wozenderlands after Shazam and Lady Shazam protected Scarecrow and the Munchkins from the Cheshire Cat, White Rabbit gives Scarecrow the axe that belonged to the Tin Man while apologising for what the Queen of Hearts and her Card Soldiers did to him. When Mister Mind has Shazam cast a spell to unite the seven Magiclands, Scarecrow and White Rabbit start to see the effects of it.

=== Music ===
- Jefferson Airplane released Grace Slick's song "White Rabbit" on their 1967 album Surrealistic Pillow, with references to the white rabbit character and the Wonderland saga in general as metaphors for drug-induced experiences.
- Electric Six's song "Feed my Fuckin' Habit" makes reference to this with the lyrics "Feed my fuckin' habit... Follow the white rabbit" (album I Shall Exterminate Everything Around Me That Restricts Me from Being the Master, 2007).
- Egypt Central's song "White Rabbit" makes references to the rabbit: "Your magic white rabbit has left its writing on the wall. We followed like Alice, and just kept falling down the hole."
- Shinedown's song "Her Name is Alice", from the compilation album Almost Alice, uses the line "And the girl that chased the rabbit, drank the wine, and took the pill..." to reference the White Rabbit; the rest of the song also references Alice in Wonderland and Through the Looking Glass.
- Vladimir Vysotsky's song "Белый кролик, Алиса и Додо" ("White Rabbit, Alice and Dodo").
- Marilyn Manson created an album and song titled "Eat Me, Drink Me" in reference to the cookies and drinks labelled "Eat Me, Drink Me" that throughout the story of Alice in Wonderland cause her to grow and shrink. The entire song constantly alludes to the story and characters of Alice in Wonderland, and describes a darker side of the story.
- Mindy Gledhill released a song "Rabbit Hole", in which she metaphorically compares following one's calling to falling through the rabbit hole, which is terrifying, but also wonderful and beautiful.
- Natalia Kills has a song on her album "Perfectionist" called "Rabbit Hole". The lyrics playfully sing "When I fall in love / I fall down the rabbit hole".
- Madison Beer has a song titled “Follow The White Rabbit”, referencing the character.

==== Musical ====
- The White Rabbit appeared as a banished fairy tale creature in the original Broadway musical Shrek (based on the 2001 film) played by Noah Rivera.
- The White Rabbit was portrayed by Edward Staudenmayer in Frank Wildhorn's musical Wonderland. In the show, he is portrayed as a panicky character with a sarcastic sense of humour. Staudenmayer praised the character's role in the story, saying, "Everything [he has] to say is funny or important." As well as the character that brings Alice to Wonderland in the first place, the Rabbit is also a close ally of her during the course of the show. His sole weapon is his pocket watch, which can turn back time; he uses it to help himself, El Gato the Cheshire Cat, Caterpillar, and Jack the White Knight escape from prison towards the end of the show.
- In the musical Alice By Heart actor Colton Ryan plays the role of the White Rabbit and its human counterpart Alfred Hallam.

=== Video games ===
- In the Sunsoft's 2006 mobile game Alice's Warped Wonderland (歪みの国のアリス, Yugami no Kuni no Arisu; Alice in Distortion World), the White Rabbit served as the "Guardian" for Ariko (the "Alice" of the game) when she is a young child and was the one in charge of adsorbing Ariko's negative emotions (as Wonderland is her coping mechanism to deal with her traumatic childhood). However, after absorbing too much of Ariko's emotions for years, the White Rabbit has become deranged and murderous. Throughout most of the game, he appears as a mirage to Ariko and is confronted in person after Ariko learns that the White Rabbit has been disguising himself as her female friend "Yukino" in the real world. In his real form, the White Rabbit has a very humanoid body and wears human clothes, which is heavily suggested to resemble Ariko's deceased father.
- In American McGee's Alice, the White Rabbit is responsible for Alice's return to Wonderland. He is first seen as Alice's soft toy, then becomes something that resembles a shrivelled version of the John Tenniel illustration. When Alice is chasing him in the Village of the Doomed, he shrinks and goes down a hole. Alice follows him by shrinking herself with a hand-made potion. They meet again in the Wonderland Woods, where he tells her to find Caterpillar. Later, he is killed by the Mad Hatter who crushes him under his foot but is revived after Alice defeated the Queen of Hearts. He reappears as a minor character in the sequel Alice Madness Returns, first in the opening sequence of the game where he is consumed by the Ruin, and then as a host of some mini-games, along with the Mad Hatter.
- In the Devil May Cry 3 manga, the White Rabbit appears as the main antagonist of the story.
- In the Nintendo DS RPG A Witch's Tale, the White Rabbit forces its way before the main character Liddell. It can be an unlockable plush for fighting too.
- Rockstar's game Manhunt features a level called "Kill the Rabbit." In this stage, the player hunts down a man wearing a white rabbit suit, which the game's antagonist describes as "Wonderland fun".
- In the Eye of the North expansion of Guild Wars, finding the boss Nulfastu Earthbound requires the player to follow a white rabbit into a rabbit hole. When the player enters, the boss appears, along with a large amount of other hostile monsters, that easily overwhelms an unprepared group of players.
- There is a reference to the White Rabbit in Castlevania: Aria of Sorrow.
- In Super Mario 64 MIPS the rabbit references the White Rabbit with a few lines, such as "I'm late for an important date."
- In The Legend of Zelda: Ocarina of Time, one of the NPCs in Hyrule Castle Town's square is running in a circle and says "I'm late, I'm late, for a very important date."
- In Heart no Kuni no Alice, a dating sim game made for the PC, PSP, and the PS2 with the theme of Alice in Wonderland, has a man named "Peter White" in which Peter White takes the role of the White Rabbit in Wonderland.
- In Dead or Alive Xtreme Venus Vacation, the 4.5 anniversary event had Luna play the role of the White Rabbit, including drawing the Owner to Wonderland after fleeing (though in this case in response to a telling off from Misaki).
- In Black Souls 2, the White Rabbit Node acts as the players closest companion during their search for Alice. She is later revealed to be one of the ones keeping him trapped in Wonderland. Her love for the play leads to her refusing to allow them to leave, instead wanting them to stay within her grasp forever.
- The White Rabbit is alluded to in the tutorial level of The Simpsons Game, in which Homer Simpson encounters a rabbit made of white chocolate. Homer remarks that the creature reminds him of the character from the story, but misremembers the title as Snow White in Stupid Town.
- The White Rabbit takes on the role of narrator, guiding players through the detective quest in Sherlock: Hidden Match-3 Cases, developed by G5 Entertainment in 2020, one of the featured stories is The Wonderful Wizard of Oz.

=== Other influences ===
A military trench-digging machine developed by the British Royal Navy at the beginning of World War II was originally known as White Rabbit No. 6, but the name was changed to Cultivator No. 6 to conceal its identity.

In the 2010s, the phrase "Follow the White Rabbit" became popular among QAnon adherents, as the initiator of the conspiracy theory often used it to encourage his followers to do their own research about the purported "cabal" running the United States.
