= Queen of Hearts (Alice's Adventures in Wonderland) =

Character from Lewis Carroll's novel Alice's Adventures in Wonderland

The Queen of Hearts
- Alice character
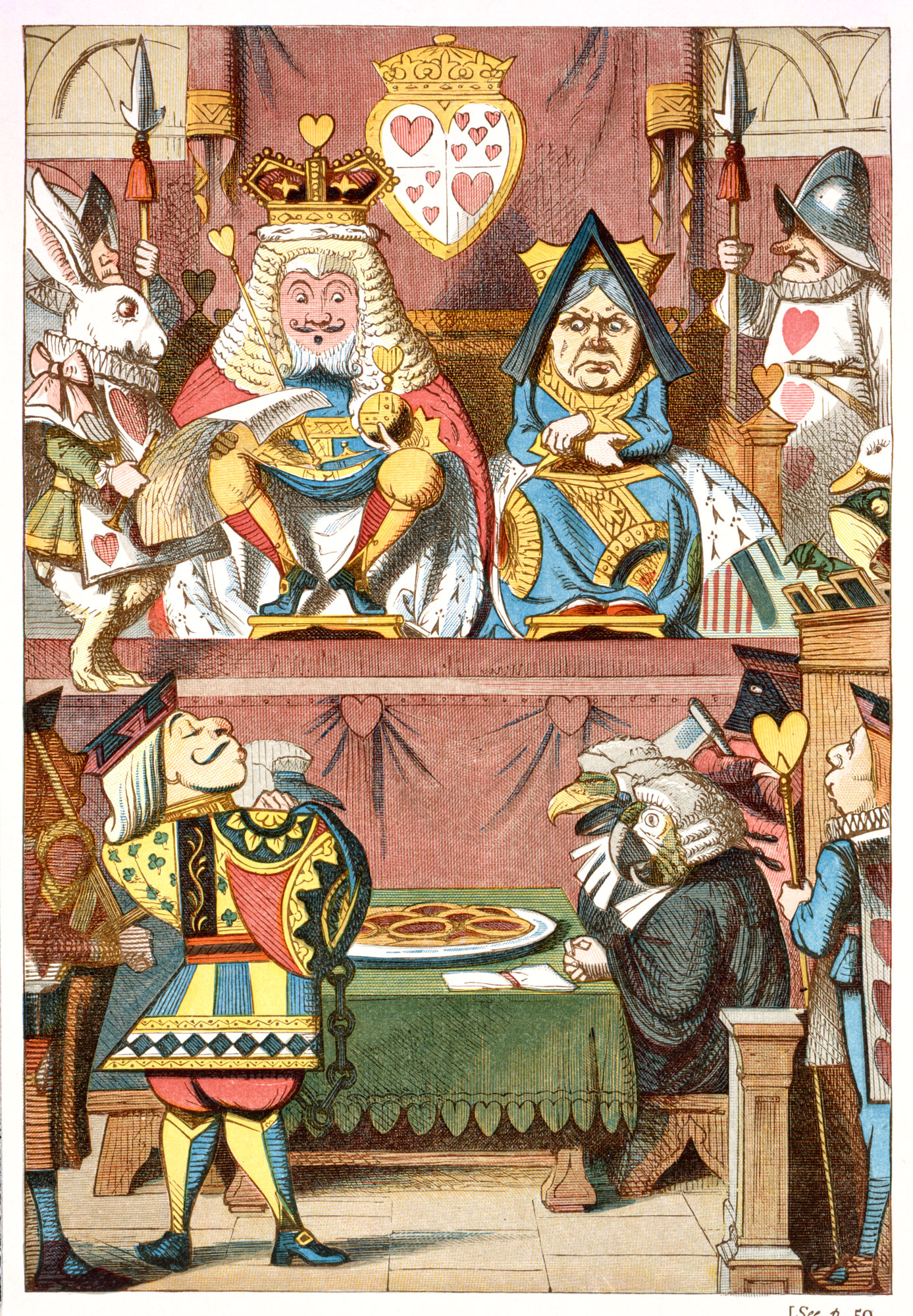
- John Tenniel's illustration of the King and Queen of Hearts at the trial of the Knave of Hearts
- First appearance: Alice's Adventures in Wonderland
- Created by: Lewis Carroll

In-universe information
- Species: Playing card
- Gender: Female
- Occupation: Queen consort or queen regnant
- Spouse: King of Hearts
- Nationality: Wonderland

The Queen of Hearts is a fictional character and the main antagonist in the 1865 book Alice's Adventures in Wonderland by Lewis Carroll. She is a childish, foul-tempered monarch whom Carroll himself describes as "a blind fury", and who is quick to give death sentences at even the slightest of offenses. One of her most famous lines is the oft-repeated "Off with his/her/their head(s)!"

The Queen is referred to as a card from a pack of playing cards by Alice, yet somehow she is able to talk and is the ruler of the lands in the story, alongside her husband, the King of Hearts. She is often confused with the Red Queen from the 1871 sequel, Through the Looking-Glass, although the two are different characters.

== Overview ==
Alice observes three playing cards painting white roses red. They drop to the ground face down at the approach of the Queen of Hearts, whom Alice has never met. When the Queen arrives, along with the King and their ten children, and asks Alice who is lying on the ground (since the backs of all playing cards look alike), Alice tells her that she does not know. The Queen then becomes frustrated and commands that her head be chopped off. She is deterred by her comparatively moderate husband by being reminded that Alice is only a child.

Generally, however, as we are told by Carroll:

The Queen had only one way of settling all difficulties, great or small. 'Off with his head!' she said, without even looking around.

One of the Queen's hobbies – besides ordering executions – is croquet; however, it is Wonderland croquet, where the balls are live hedgehogs and the mallets are flamingoes. This is presumably with the aim that the birds' blunt beaks should strike, but, as Alice observes, it is complicated by the fact that they keep looking back up at the players- as well as the hedgehogs' tendency to scuttle away without waiting to be hit. The Queen's soldiers act as the arches (or hoops) on the croquet grounds, but have to leave off being arches every time the Queen has an executioner drag away the victim, so that, by the end of the game in the story, the only players that remain are the Queen herself, the King, and Alice.

Despite the frequency of death sentences, it would appear few people are actually beheaded. The King of Hearts quietly pardons many of his subjects when the Queen is not looking (although this did not seem to be the case with The Duchess), and her soldiers humor her but do not carry out her orders. The Gryphon tells Alice, "It's all her fancy: she executes nobody, you know." Nevertheless, all creatures in Wonderland fear the Queen. In the final chapters, the Queen sentences Alice again (for defending the Knave of Hearts), and she offers a bizarre approach towards justice: sentence before the verdict.

Modern portrayals in popular culture usually let her play the role of a villain because of the menace the character exemplifies, but in the book she does not fill that purpose. She is just one of the many obstacles that Alice has to encounter on the journey, but unlike other obstacles, she makes a higher potential threat.

== Origins ==
The Queen is believed by some to be a caricature of Queen Victoria, with elements of reality that Carroll felt correctly would make her at once instantly recognizable to parents reading the story to children, and also fantastical enough to make her unrecognizable to children. Some elements of reality in line that would make the Queen of Hearts recognizable as Queen Victoria were the way in which their subjects viewed them as rulers as one Queen was loved while the other was feared. Queen Victoria was loved more by her people in contrast with her consort, Prince Albert, in part because some did not trust him as he was not English. The Queen of Hearts was feared by the people of Wonderland and would give the order for execution for even the slightest offense, although her husband would often quietly pardon them. The reference to Queen Victoria is explicit in Jonathan Miller's 1966 television version where she and the King of Hearts are portrayed without any attempt at fantasy, or disguise as to their true natures or personality.

The Queen may also be a reference to Queen Margaret of the House of Lancaster. During the War of the Roses, a red rose was the symbol of the House of Lancaster. Their rivals, the House of York, had a white rose for their symbol. The gardeners' painting the white roses red may be a reference to these two houses. It is also possible that she is based on Queen Elizabeth I, as her yelling "off with their head" demonstrates the Victorian stereotype of a Tudor king/queen.

== Illustrations ==
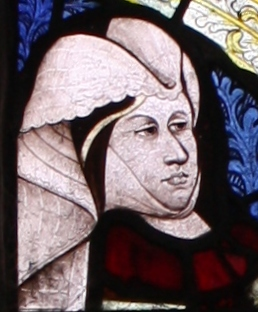
Image of Elizabeth de Mowbray, Duchess of Norfolk that inspired the original illustrations of the Queen of Hearts.

After unsuccessfully attempting to illustrate Alice's Adventures in Wonderland himself, Lewis Carroll was persuaded to engage a professional artist to provide the illustrations. He turned to cartoonist John Tenniel, who was known for his regular contributions to the satirical magazine Punch (published 1841–1992, 1996–2002).

Tenniel's inspiration for the Queen of Hearts was an image of Elizabeth de Mowbray, Duchess of Norfolk in one of the medieval stained glass windows at Holy Trinity Church, Long Melford, Suffolk.

The illustrations for the Alice books were engraved onto blocks of wood, to be printed in the wood engraving process. The original wood blocks are now in the collection of the Bodleian Library in Oxford, England. They are not usually on public display, but were exhibited in 2003.

== Confusion with the Red Queen ==
She is commonly mistaken for the Red Queen in the story's sequel, Through the Looking-Glass, but in reality shares none of her characteristics other than being a queen. Carroll, in his lifetime, made the distinction of the two Queens by saying:

I pictured to myself the Queen of Hearts as a sort of embodiment of ungovernable passion – a blind and aimless Fury. The Red Queen I pictured as a Fury, but of another type; her passion must be cold and calm – she must be formal and strict, yet not unkindly; pedantic to the 10th degree, the concentrated essence of all governesses!

— Lewis Carroll, in "Alice on the Stage"

The 1951 animated film Alice in Wonderland perpetuates the long-standing confusion between the Red Queen and the Queen of Hearts. In the film, the Queen of Hearts delivers several of the Red Queen's statements, the most notable being based on her "all the ways about here belong to me". Both characters say this to suggest their importance and possible arrogance, but in the Red Queen's case, it has a double meaning since her status as a Chess-queen means that she can move in any direction she desires.

In the American McGee's Alice adaptation of the books, the characters are also conflated, leading to further popular misconception.

== Adaptations ==
=== Disney version ===
The Queen of Hearts
- Disney's Alice in Wonderland character
- First appearance: Alice in Wonderland (1951)
- Voiced by: Verna Felton (1951); Tress MacNeille (1999–present); April Winchell (Kinect Disneyland Adventures, Disney Speedstorm)
- Portrayed by: Rita Ora (Descendants); Ruby Rose Turner (young) (Descendants)

In-universe information
- Alias: Bridget (in Descendants)
- Gender: Female
- Spouse: King of Hearts
- Children: Red (daughter; in Descendants); Pink (daughter; in Descendants)
- Relatives: Valentina Corazón (possible descendant; in Alice's Wonderland Bakery); Rosa Corazón (possible descendant; in Alice's Wonderland Bakery)

In the Disney animated feature Alice in Wonderland, the Queen of Hearts appears as the movie's main antagonist. She makes her appearance at the climax of the movie.

The character was voiced by Verna Felton. She is portrayed as a haughty sadist, who enjoys decapitating anyone who merely annoys her. Her presence is all the more striking because of how tiny her husband the King is (he barely comes up to her knee). Similar to the book, Alice meets three cards painting the roses red, since they planted white roses by mistake. When the Queen arrives, she finds those three cards guilty and shouts "Off with their heads!" Once the unfortunate cards are dragged away, she turns her attention to Alice. Refusing to answer her questions with a presumption that only she can ask them, she quickly ropes her into a game of croquet. The game ends with the Queen tripping herself over, and Alice is punished unfairly by the Queen as a result of the Cheshire Cat's mischievous antics. Before the Queen can give the order, the King suggests holding a trial for Alice. The Queen, grudgingly, but reasonably, agrees. At Alice's trial, the Queen calls the March Hare, the Dormouse, and the Mad Hatter to witness, who hold an unbirthday party for her and cheer her up considerably. During the party, the Cheshire Cat reappears and upsets the Dormouse. The frightened Dormouse runs all over, and in an attempt to crush the Dormouse, the King of Hearts accidentally hits the Queen on the head with the gavel, which is hastily passed into the March Hare's hands, then the Hatter's, and finally Alice's. The Queen, of course, punishes Alice unfairly for it and is going to have her arrested. But Alice eats mushrooms she had procured earlier, which make her grow bigger. Although Rule No. 42 says that anyone more than a mile high must leave the court immediately, Alice feels free to call the Queen a "fat, pompous, bad tempered old tyrant". Unfortunately, she subsequently shrinks down to her normal size, but flees and is able to escape.

She is one of the primary members of the Disney Villains franchise. She is also a meet and greet character at the Disney Parks.

==== Other films and television appearances ====
In the 1991 Disney Channel series Adventures in Wonderland, the Queen was played by Armelia McQueen. She appears as a short-tempered and childish but basically benevolent ruler. She was alternately called "The Queen of Hearts" and "The Red Queen" during the course of the series.

She has recurring cameos in the television series House of Mouse, voiced by Tress MacNeille, as well as its direct-to-video films Mickey's Magical Christmas: Snowed in at the House of Mouse and Mickey's House of Villains, in the last one being one of the main villains who take over the House of Mouse.

Another Queen of Hearts (real name Valentina Corazón) appeared in the animated series Alice's Wonderland Bakery (possibly a descendant of her like the rest of the characters in the series with respect to the characters in the 1951 film), voiced by Eden Espinosa, who was nominated for the Children's and Family Emmy Award for Outstanding Voice Performance in a Preschool Animated Program for her performance. She also has a daughter named Rosa, who is one of the best friends of Alice (great-granddaughter of the Alice from the film).

The Queen of Hearts appears in the live-action film Descendants: The Rise of Red, played by Rita Ora and Ruby Rose Turner (the latter as Bridget, a young Queen of Hearts), where her daughter Red is a main character. The Queen of Hearts acts as the main antagonist, trying to take over Auradon. When her daughter travels back in time, she discovers that young Bridget was a sweet and friendly person, whose personality changed due to a prank. After avoiding this and returning to the present, Red discovers her mother still retaining the good personality of her youth. Turner reprises the role as the young Bridget in the stop motion short film Wickedly Sweet: A Descendants Short Story (in a voice role) and in the short film Shuffle of Love: A Descendants Short Story. Ora reprises the role as the Queen of Hearts in the sequel Descendants: Wicked Wonderland, where is also introduced another daughter of the character, Pink.

==== Disney video games ====
The Queen of Hearts is the final boss on the Japanese version of Mickey Mousecapade (being replaced by Maleficent in the North American version), a 1987 video game where Alice is her hostage.

The Queen of Hearts exacted her revenge upon Alice in the game Disney's Villains' Revenge where she stole the ending page of the story and changed the ending, so Alice lost her head. Jiminy Cricket, the player and Alice's headless body retrieve the head and escape the labyrinth of the Queen. They meet one last time in the final battle and she surrenders.

The Queen appears in the Square-Enix/Disney video game Kingdom Hearts, in her homeworld. As in the film, she holds Alice on trial, only this time for attempting to steal her heart. The main heroes in the game, Sora, Donald, and Goofy, intervene, telling the Queen that Alice is innocent. The Queen challenges them to provide proof of their theory, and with help from the Cheshire Cat, the three are able to do so. The Queen, however, enraged at being proven wrong, orders them executed and Alice imprisoned in a cage on the roof. The three are able to fight off the Queen's guards and destroy the cage controls, but Alice is kidnapped before they can save her. The Queen orders a search for Alice, and temporarily pardons Sora, Donald, and Goofy, requesting that they look for Alice as well. She returns in Kingdom Hearts: Chain of Memories, only this time as a figment of Sora's memories. Again, she holds Alice on trial, this time for attempting to steal her memories. In both games, Sora, Donald, and Goofy prove Alice's innocence by defeating the Trickmaster Heartless, the real culprit. The Queen congratulates Sora for solving the mystery, and once again demonstrates her bi-polar personality by pardoning Alice. She is absent in Kingdom Hearts II, but appears in Kingdom Hearts 358/2 Days along with her homeworld. A digital version of her later appears in Kingdom Hearts Coded.

The Queen of Hearts appears as a playable character to unlock for a limited time in the video game Disney Magic Kingdoms.

The mobile game Disney Twisted-Wonderland is focused on Night Raven College, an academy whose students live in seven different dormitories based on different Disney Villains known as "The Big Seven", one of them being the Heartslabyul dormitory, founded in honor of the Queen of Hearts.

=== Alice's Warped Wonderland ===
In the Sunsoft's 2006 mobile game Alice's Warped Wonderland (歪みの国のアリス, Yugami no kuni no Arisu; Alice in Distortion World), the Queen of Hearts's personality and appearance is vastly different from other versions of the character. She is depicted as a beautiful young girl with long blond hair in a pink dress and wields a large scythe. While emotional at times and a has morbid fondness for beheading people, the Queen loves Ariko (the "Alice" of the game), claiming to love her most out of all the other Wonderland denizens, and wants to protect her from remembering her suppressed memories of her traumatic childhood. However, due to Ariko's depressed state of mind, the Queen's love for Alice is warped and seeks to behead her as way to protect her (which she succeed in one of the bad endings). Like the Cheshire Cat and the White Rabbit, the Queen possess the power to enter the real world and interact with people besides Ariko.

=== American McGee's Alice ===
In the video game American McGee's Alice, the Queen of Hearts is the final boss and the reason for Wonderland's decay. When Alice fights her, she discovers that the Queen is her dark side – an embodiment of her insanity; the Queen must be destroyed for Alice to become sane once more. The Queen's appearance is different in American McGee's Alice from how she is in the book: she appears first as a faceless entity having tentacles for arms, legs, and hair. It is later revealed that this is a mere puppet and that the true Queen of Hearts is a horrible monster in the image of a real anatomical heart. She is called both the Queen of Hearts and the Red Queen interchangeably throughout the game. No mention is made of the Red Queen from Through the Looking Glass. However, the White Queen is seen for only a moment, as her head is chopped off by the enemy in The Pale Realm. It's implied that after Alice was placed in the asylum the Red Queen and the Queen of Hearts fused together which explains why the Queen of Hearts is able to control the red piece and the cards at the same time.

In the sequel, Alice: Madness Returns, the Queen of Hearts is sought by Alice for assistance in stopping an Infernal Train from tearing apart Wonderland and driving her back into insanity. The Queen claims, when found in the ruins of the Red Kingdom, that Alice is being manipulated by someone other than herself, that this person is trying to erase her memories, particularly about the fire in her childhood, which is tearing her sanity apart. It later turns out that this person is none other than her psychiatrist Dr. Angus Bumby, who has been revealed to have raped Alice's older sister Lizzy and burned down the house with Lizzy and Alice's parents to cover up the crime, and that he is attempting to erase Alice's memories and subject her to prostitution after it. In this sequel, the Red Queen has changed considerably, taking the appearance of a younger Alice, only in a royal dress befitting the Queen of Hearts, with large fleshy claws rather than hands, and her lower body composed of fleshy tentacles that spread throughout the entire castle, which is actually the Queen's body itself. Some argue she is actually based not on Alice herself, but her sister, as she also referred to her as "Lizzy" in the following dialogue, and considering she felt guilty of the death of her family, its possible her subconscious projected her dead sister in the queen she herself killed in the previous game.

=== The Looking Glass Wars ===
In The Looking Glass Wars by Frank Beddor, the ruling dynasty of the Wonderland is the Heart family. The title of Queen of Hearts is a hereditary title for the Queen of Wonderland. The Queen of Hearts from Alice in Wonderland is reimagined as Queen Redd, the enemy and aunt of the heroine, Alyss. She kills Alyss's parents and usurps the throne of Wonderland.

The true Queen of Hearts in this story is Genevieve Heart, Alyss's mother as an apparent re-imagining of the White Queen. Alyss is, therefore, the Princess of Hearts.

=== Alice in the Country of Hearts ===
In the manga Alice in the Country of Hearts, the Queen of Hearts is known as Vivaldi. She isn't as much a main character, though, and she has very few parts in the current books. Vivaldi rules Heart Castle and is feuding with the other territories over Wonderland. She is beautiful with black hair, unlike other adaptations. She speaks in the majestic plural, e.g., "We are happy you are here to see us." As discovered through Heart no Kuni no Alice the game by Quinrose (the predecessor to the manga). Blood Dupree (The Hatter) is Vivaldi's little brother though it is alluded to be a romantic interest for Vivaldi until Alice discovers the secret.

=== Alice miniseries ===
In the two-part series Alice, hosted by the SyFy Channel, the Queen of Hearts is portrayed by Kathy Bates as a refined but ruthless drug lord. The miniseries is set one hundred and fifty years after the original Alice's first visit to Wonderland (the heroine is an unrelated character) and the Queen is (as usual) the primary villain of the series. As is customary, the Queen is depicted as narcissistic, declaring herself as "the most powerful woman in the history of literature" and obese. Her calm, cold demeanour suggests that she too is a mixture of the Queen of Hearts and the Red Queen. Her name is given as "Mary Elizabeth Heart", and it is suggested that the Hearts are the "Red" royal family who seized control of Wonderland from the "White" royal family.

=== Once Upon a Time ===
Cora the Queen of Hearts
- Once Upon a Time / Once Upon a Time in Wonderland character
- First appearance: "Hat Trick" (season 1, episode 17)
- Portrayed by: Barbara Hershey; Rose McGowan (young); Jennifer Koenig ("Hat Trick")

In-universe information
- Gender: Female
- Family: The Miller (father)
- Spouse: Henry
- Children: Regina (daughter); Zelena (daughter)
- Relatives: Henry Mills (grandson); Robin (granddaughter); Lucy (great granddaughter)

The Queen of Hearts appears in the Once Upon a Time episode "Hat Trick", played by Jennifer Koenig. In the show's second and third seasons, it is revealed that the Queen of Hearts is, in fact, Cora (Barbara Hershey), the mother of the Evil Queen and the Wicked Witch of the West. In her earlier life, Cora (portrayed by Rose McGowan) was also the miller's daughter (the heroine of the Rumpelstiltskin story).

=== Come Away ===
The Queen is portrayed by Angelina Jolie in the 2020 movie Come Away, and is depicted as an imaginary counterpart to Alice's alcoholic mother Rose (also played by Jolie). This version of the Queen of Hearts is kept as separate character from the Red Queen, who is the imaginary counterpart to Rose's stuffy and disapproving older sister Eleanor.

=== Ever After High ===
In the fashion doll line Ever After High, the Queen of Hearts has a daughter named Lizzie Hearts, who is also a recurring character in the franchise's animated series. The Queen of Hearts appears in one of the animated specials where she is voiced by Karen Strassman. She also appears in some of the tie-in novels.

=== Other versions and adaptations ===
- In various film and television versions of the novel, The Queen has been played by May Robson, Ronald Long, Zsa Zsa Gabor, Eve Arden, and Jayne Meadows.
- In the 1999 Alice in Wonderland television movie, the character is played by Miranda Richardson, whose portrayal is strongly reminiscent of her role as the spoiled Queenie in Blackadder.
- Pandora Hearts has Miranda Barma who would later become the chain Demios the Executor also nicknamed Queen of Hearts and they have a similar obsession of cutting heads.
- The Queen is one of the characters adopted by Gwen Stefani in her Wonderland-themed music video What You Waiting For?. She wears a red gown and a crown reminiscent of the Imperial State Crown from the British Crown Jewels. The Queen wanders through a garden populated with flamingos and pushes Alice (also Stefani) into a pool of her own tears.
- The Queen of Hearts features in Unsuk Chin's 2007 opera Alice in Wonderland; the role was created for Dame Gwyneth Jones.
- In the 2009 animated series Sandra the Fairytale Detective, her name is Theressa.
- The Queen is a major character in Christopher Wheeldon's 2011 full-length ballet Alice's Adventures in Wonderland, created for The Royal Ballet. The role was created for principal dancer Zenaida Yanowsky and includes a spoof of the Rose Adagio from The Sleeping Beauty.
- The Queen appeared briefly during the 2012 Summer Olympics opening ceremony in London in a segment dedicated to the villains of British children's literature.
- In Marissa Meyer's 2016 novel Heartless, the backstory of the Queen of Hearts is told, in which she is a young girl who aspires to be a baker, but is instead taken off course by the anticipated proposal of the King of Hearts.
- The Queen of Hearts appears in the twelfth episode ("And the Broken Staff") of The Librarians. She is brought to life by the wizard Prospero as a distraction for the Librarians but is subsequently tricked into attacking her own reflection, turning her into a pack of cards (mirroring the ending of the original story).
- The manga One Piece has Charlotte Linlin, also known as "Big Mom", whose appearance and character is mostly based on the Queen of Hearts.
- In Andrzej Sapkowski's short story Złote popołudnie (The Golden Afternoon) which is postmodern retelling of Alice's Adventures in Wonderland the Queen of Hearts is identified with Queen Mab.
- In the 1998 television film A Soldier's Sweetheart directed by Thomas Michael Donnelly Marianne's character is foreshadowed at the end of the card game when the last card laid down is the Queen of Hearts.
- During the 4.5 anniversary for Dead or Alive Xtreme Venus Vacation, the character Monica plays the role of the Queen of Hearts. Her role was significantly softened compared to usual, simply dealing a game of chance regarding finding a heart, as well as willingly letting the Owner leave Wonderland after he won.
- In the 2015 Cbeebies show, Pantomime the Queen of Hearts is portrayed by Justin Fletcher, she is the Dame in this version and, in the tradition of pantomime dames, is played by a man for comedy rather than drama, as such, while she is the closest thing to a villain in the Panto, she cuts a insane toddler-like figure instead of a threat. She sings the song "the Queen", about herself, with the card soldiers played by a child chorus. The King is absent & the knave is reduced to a bit part.
- The 2018 role-playing video-game Black Souls II depicts Queen of Hearts as a moe art style young girl.
- The Queen of Hearts is voiced by Emilia Clarke in the 2024 animated movie The Night Before Christmas in Wonderland.
- In the 2021 satire film Alice, Through the Looking, the Queen is portrayed by Carol Cleaveland. She is a twisted lookalike of Queen Elizabeth the 2nd. This Queen of Hearts is portrayed as a patron of the arts who deeply hates artists, and has them killed by her guards. Instead of "Off with his/her/their heads" her favoured phrase is "And what do you do?". After killing off a film crew and making a speech, an unknown hand shoots the Queen with a old pistol, decapitating her, leading to a Monty Python-style animated sequence, ending in Alice (Saskia Axten) awakening from her dream.
- In the 2025 Russian musical film Alice in Wonderland, the Queen of Hearts is portrayed by Irina Gorbacheva.

== Sources ==
- Jenkins, Simon (1999). England's Thousand Best Churches. London: Penguin. ISBN 978-0-14-103930-5.
