= Wonderland (fictional country) =

Setting of Alice's Adventures in Wonderland

- Alice's Adventures in Wonderland location
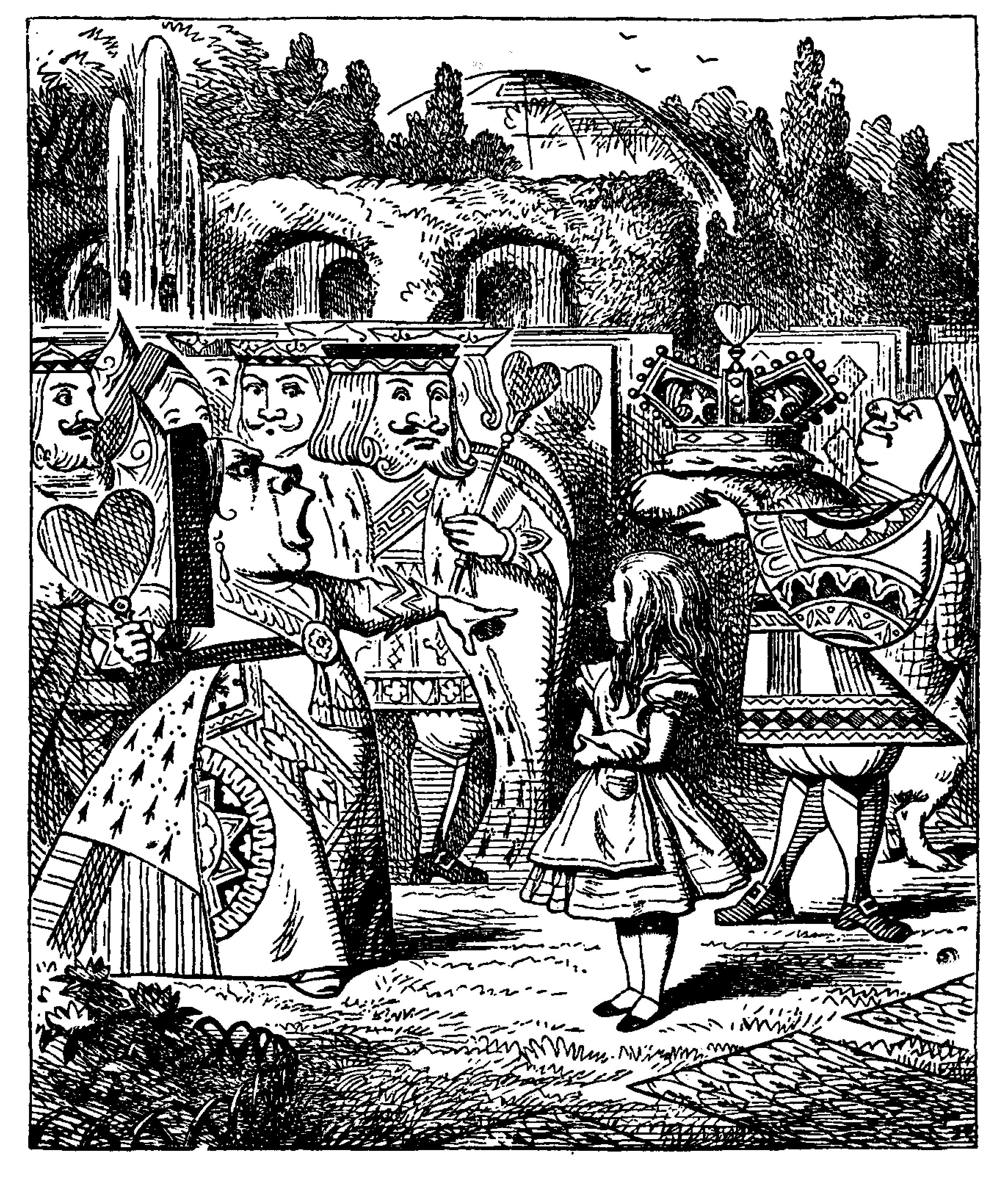
- The Queen discovers Alice in her garden.

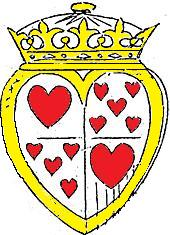
- Coat of Arms of Wonderland
- First appearance: Alice's Adventures in Wonderland
- Created by: Lewis Carroll
- Genre: Fantasy

In-universe information
- Other name: Underland
- Type: Monarchy
- Ruled by: Queen of Hearts
- Locations: Rabbit hole, March Hare's house, Queen's Croquet Ground
- Characters: White Rabbit, Duchess, Cheshire Cat, the Hatter, March Hare, Mock Turtle, Queen of Hearts

Wonderland is the setting for Lewis Carroll's 1865 children's novel Alice's Adventures in Wonderland and its sequel, Through the Looking-Glass. Carroll first invented the world in 1862 to entertain Alice Liddell and her sisters during a boating holiday, and subsequently became one of the most famous fictitious settings in all of English literature.

Wonderland is found beneath the land of England, which Alice reaches by following a White Rabbit down a hole, through which she falls into a long tunnel.

Since Carroll's first telling of this tale, Wonderland has been revisited countless times, including in the 1951 film Alice in Wonderland by Walt Disney, which was reimagined in 2010 as Alice in Wonderland and renamed "Underland," because Alice is said to have misunderstood what she had heard.

== Geography ==
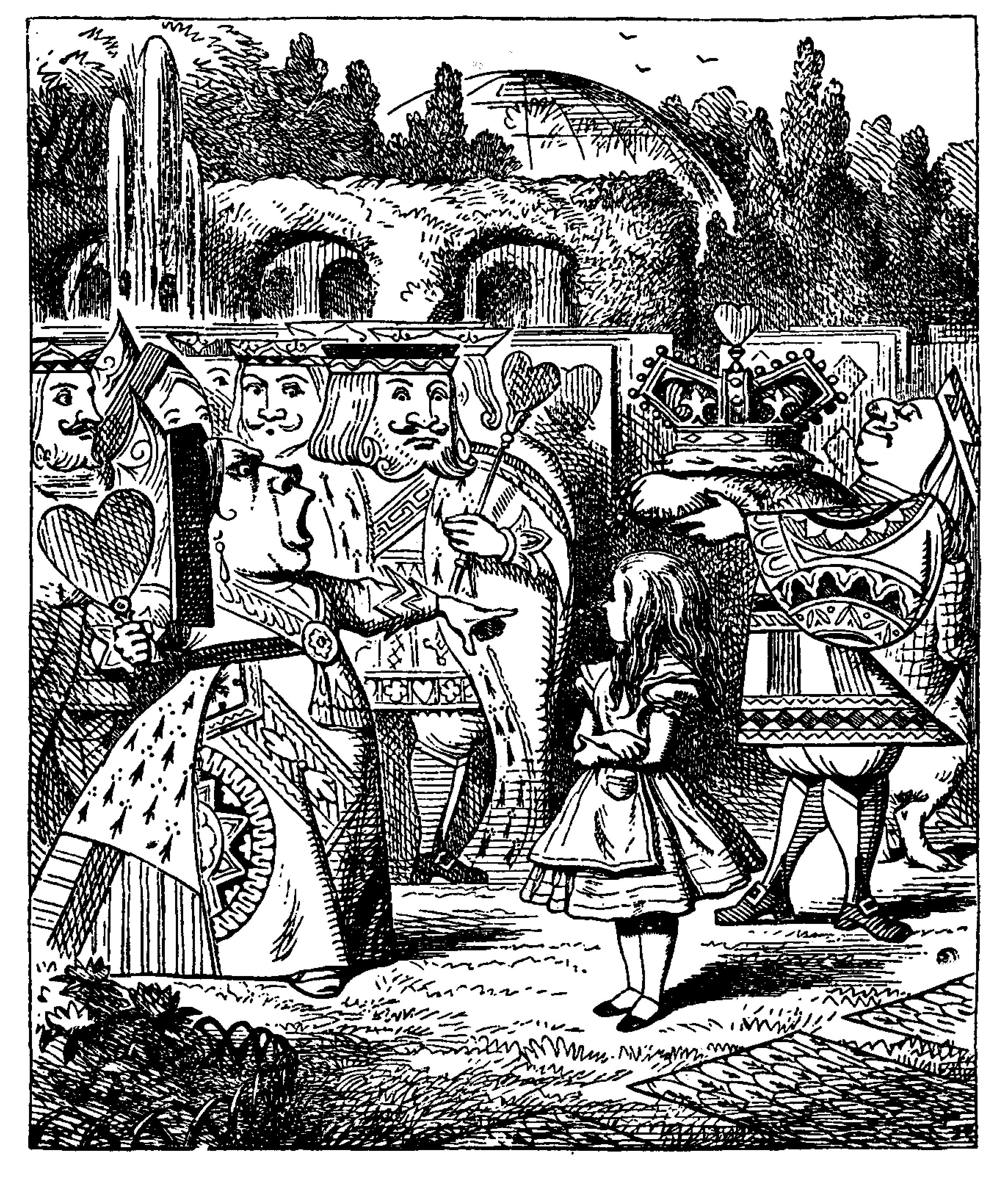
The royal garden in Wonderland

Wonderland, the surreal and whimsical setting of Alice's Adventures in Wonderland by Lewis Carroll, is a world where conventional geography and logic are turned upside down. Alice enters this bizarre world through a rabbit hole, leading her to a hall of doors, each offering passage to different, unpredictable parts of Wonderland. This dreamlike landscape includes a beautiful but initially inaccessible garden, a pool formed by Alice's own tears, and a magical mushroom with the power to alter her size. The geography further unravels with scenes like the Mad Hatter's perpetual tea party, set at an endlessly long table outdoors, and the Queen of Hearts’ croquet ground, where flamingos serve as mallets and hedgehogs as balls. The courtroom, where Alice witnesses an absurd trial, encapsulates the chaotic and arbitrary nature of Wonderland. Throughout her journey, Alice navigates a constantly shifting environment that mirrors her inner experiences, emphasizing themes of transformation, disorientation, and the challenges of growing up in a world where nothing is as it seems.

In the story, Wonderland is accessed by an underground passage, and Alice reaches it by travelling down a rabbit hole. While the location is apparently somewhere beneath Oxfordshire, Carroll does not specify how far down it is, and he has Alice speculate whether it is near the center of the Earth or even at the Antipodes.

The land is heavily wooded and grows mushrooms. There are well-kept gardens and substantial houses such as those of the Duchess and the White Rabbit. Wonderland has a seacoast where the Mock Turtle lives.

== Government ==
The land is nominally ruled by the Queen of Hearts, whose whimsical decrees of capital punishment are routinely nullified by the King of Hearts. Other kings and queens are mentioned as their guests, and are implied to be the kings and queens of the other card suits. There is at least one Duchess.

== Inhabitants ==
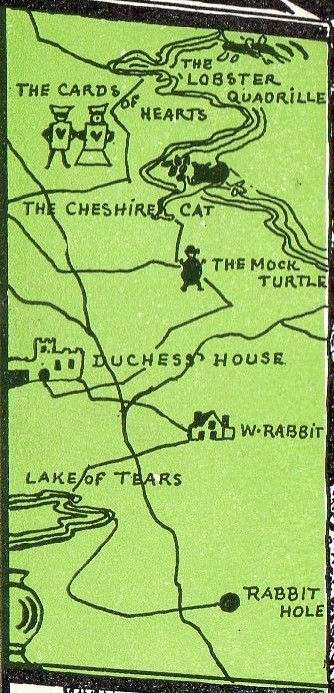
1899 map of Wonderland by Blanche McManus

The main population consists of animated playing cards: the royal family (hearts), courtiers (diamonds), soldiers (clubs), and servants (spades). In addition, there are many talking animals.

Among the characters Alice meets are:

- Bill the Lizard
- Caterpillar
- Cheshire Cat
- Dodo
- Dormouse
- Duchess
- Gryphon
- King of Hearts
- Knave of Hearts
- Mad Hatter
- March Hare
- Mock Turtle
- Pat
- Queen of Hearts
- White Rabbit

== In other media ==
Wonderland is featured in many of its adaptions:

=== Disney ===
- Wonderland is featured in Walt Disney's 1951 animated film Alice in Wonderland.
- Wonderland is featured in Tim Burton's 2010 film Alice in Wonderland. Here, it is actually named Underland as Alice misheard the name as a child where she believed it to be "Wonderland." Alice returns to Wonderland when the White Queen is challenging her tyrannical sister the Red Queen for the crown of Underland.
- Wonderland is feature in Disney Channel and Disney+ original movie Descendants: The Rise of Red (2024).
- Wonderland will be feature in the upcoming Disney Channel and Disney+ original movie Descendants: Wicked Wonderland (2026).

=== Once Upon a Time ===
Two interations of Wonderland are featured across the ABC television series Once Upon a Time and its spin-off Once Upon a Time in Wonderland.

- In the first iteration, the realm is ruled by the Queen of Hearts, the Red King and Queen, the White King and Queen, and the Caterpillar. Some of the known locations in Wonderland include the Black Forest (a dark forest where no light shines through) and its Boro Grove (where those affected by the scent of the perfume flowers are mesmerized and slowly turned into trees), the Boiling Sea (which is a sea of boiling water), Jafar's Lair (a floating landmass where Jafar lives and keeps his prisoners), Mallow Marsh (a marsh that consists of sticky marshmallow-like substances), Mimsy Meadows (where Alice and Cyrus buried Cyrus' lamp until it was excavated by the White Rabbit under the Red Queen's orders), the Outlands (the outskirts of Wonderland where Alice and Cyrus planted an invisible tent given to Cyrus by the Caterpillar), the Queen of Hearts' Palace, Tulgey Woods (a forest where the Mad Hatter's house resides), Underland (which serves as a lair for the Caterpillar and his Collectors), Whispering Woods (where a deformed man named Grendel resided until he was killed by Jafar), and Wonderland Castle (where the Red Queen resides).
- The seventh season of Once Upon a Time features a second iteration known as New Wonderland. Not much is known about it, except that it is home to a local Jabberwocky and has an Infinite Maze.

=== Other adaptions ===
- Wonderland appears in Music Theatre International's musical Alice in Wonderland Jr., which is a theatrical adaptation of the Disney film with various additions and alterations.
- Wonderland appears in Lewis Carroll's novella "Alice's Adventures Underground", the first iteration of Alice in Wonderland .
- American McGee's video game, Alice, depicts Wonderland as a symptom of an insane Alice's mind.
- In the third volume of Shazam!, the Magiclands location of the Wozenderlands is the result of Dorothy Gale and Alice uniting the Land of Oz and Wonderland against the threat from the Monsterlands.
- Wonderland serves as the primary setting for Black Souls II, a place that presents a psychological horror scene.

== See also ==
- Looking-glass world
- Land of Oz
- Middle-earth
- Narnia
- Neverland
