= March Hare =

Fictional character from Alice's Adventures in Wonderland

- Alice character
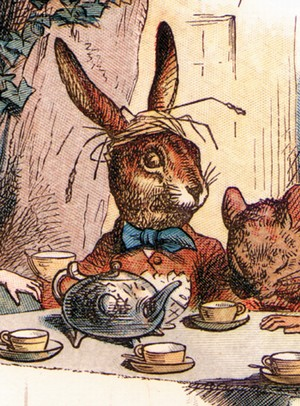
- The March Hare. Illustration by John Tenniel
- First appearance: Alice's Adventures in Wonderland
- Last appearance: Through the Looking-Glass
- Created by: Lewis Carroll

In-universe information
- Alias: Haigha
- Species: Hare
- Gender: Male
- Occupation: Host of the Mad Tea Party; Messenger
- Nationality: Wonderland

The March Hare (called Haigha in Through the Looking-Glass) is a character most famous for appearing in the tea party scene in Lewis Carroll's 1865 book Alice's Adventures in Wonderland.

The main character, Alice, hypothesizes,

"The March Hare will be much the most interesting, and perhaps as this is May it won't be raving mad – at least not so mad as it was in March."

"Mad as a March hare" is a common British English phrase, both now and in Carroll's time, and appears in John Heywood's collection of proverbs published in 1546. It is reported in The Annotated Alice by Martin Gardner that this proverb is based on popular belief about hares' behaviour at the beginning of the long breeding season, which lasts from February to September in Britain. Early in the season, unreceptive females often use their forelegs to repel overenthusiastic males. It used to be incorrectly believed that these bouts were between males fighting for breeding supremacy.

Like the character's friend, the Hatter, the March Hare feels compelled to always behave as though it is tea-time because the Hatter supposedly "murdered the time" whilst singing for the Queen of Hearts. Sir John Tenniel's illustration also shows him with straw on his head, a common way to depict madness in Victorian times. The March Hare later appears at the trial for the Knave of Hearts. He and the Hatter reappear in Through the Looking-Glass as "Haigha" and "Hatta", the messengers of the White King ("Haigha" is pronounced to rhyme with "mayor" according to Carroll, making it a homophone of "hare" for non-rhotic speakers).

== Major depictions ==
=== Disney animated film ===
March Hare
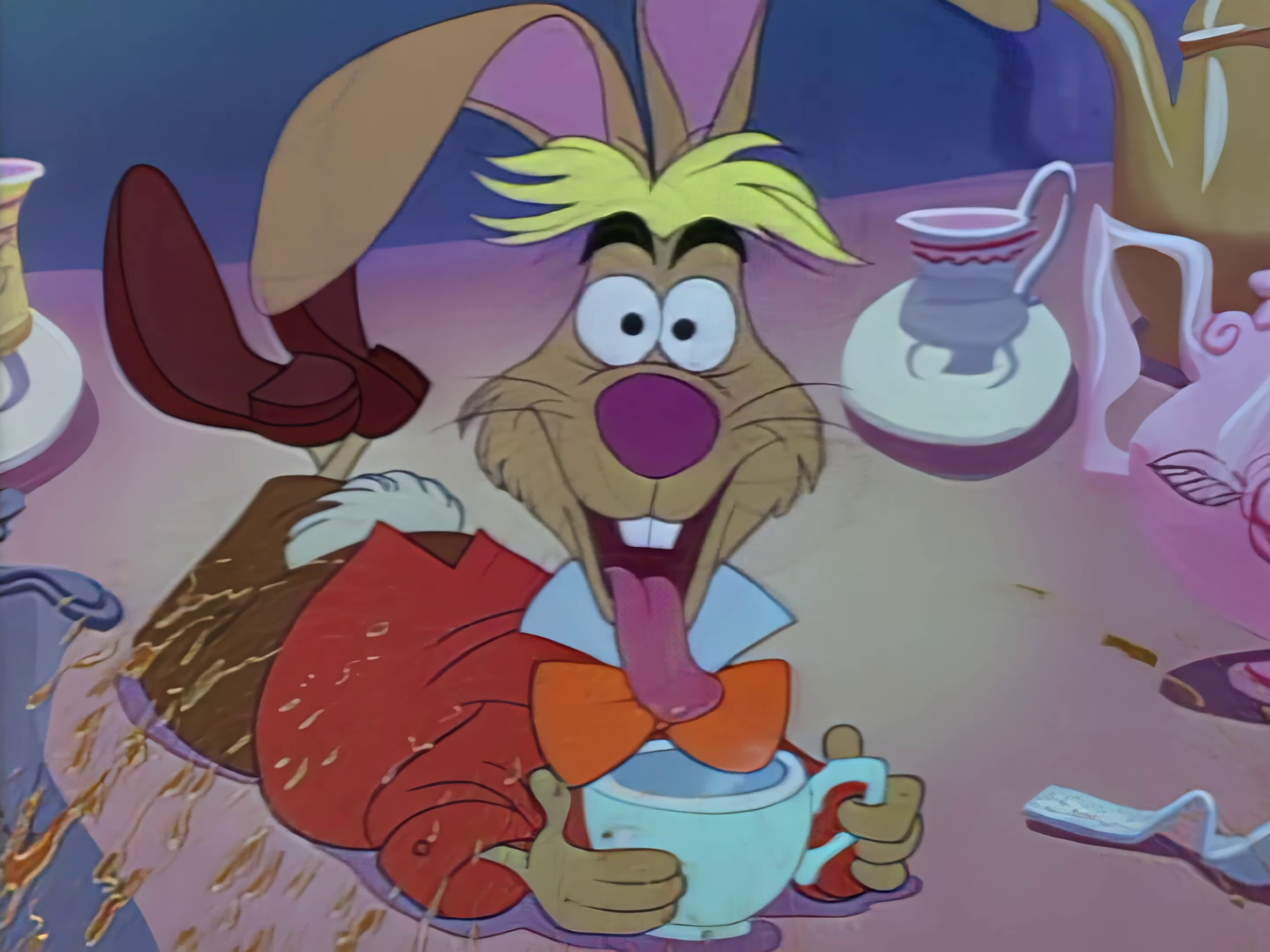
- The March Hare as he appears in the 1951 film.
- First appearance: Alice in Wonderland (1951)
- Voiced by: Jerry Colonna; Jesse Corti (Bonkers); Maurice LaMarche (House of Mouse); Jeff Bennett (Kinect Disneyland Adventures, 2011-present)

In-universe information
- Species: Hare
- Gender: Male
- Nationality: Wonderland

Disney's Alice in Wonderland, an animated film, depicted the March Hare at the tea party as being deliriously confused. He repeatedly offers Alice a cup of tea, but distractedly yanks the cup out of her reach or takes it from her hands just as she is about to drink. He was voiced by Jerry Colonna, after whom his appearance and personality were modelled. He was animated by Ward Kimball.

This version of the character was also a semi-regular on Bonkers and one of the guests in House of Mouse, often seen seated with the Mad Hatter. During these appearances, the March Hare was voiced by Jesse Corti and Maurice LaMarche.

In the Kingdom Hearts video game series, March Hare makes a cameo appearance in a painting in the Tea Party Garden in the 2002 video game Kingdom Hearts and its 2009 sequel Kingdom Hearts 358/2 Days. He later made a physical appearance in the 2013 game Kingdom Hearts χ.

=== Tim Burton's Alice in Wonderland ===
Thackery Earwicket
- Thackery Earwicket as he appears in the 2010 film.
- First appearance: Alice in Wonderland (2010)
- Created by: Tim Burton
- Voiced by: Paul Whitehouse

In-universe information
- Full name: Thackery Earwicket
- Alias: March Hare
- Species: Hare
- Gender: Male
- Occupation: Cook
- Nationality: Underland/Wonderland

The March Hare appears in the 2010 Disney film Alice in Wonderland, voiced by Paul Whitehouse. His full name is Thackery Earwicket; this, however, is not mentioned in the film. In the movie, the March Hare behaves as if constantly nerve-wracked and completely delirious. He is a cook in the film, and the way he eccentrically throws dishes and pots suggests he is an amalgam of both the March Hare and the cook from Lewis Carroll's original book. The March Hare has a strong Scottish accent in this movie, while his friend the Mad Hatter (played by Johnny Depp) switches into a Scottish accent as well whenever his emotions are strained. He is first seen in the "Tea Party" scene, which takes place at his "Hare House" windmill. Thackery hosts a tea party, which he shares with Tarrant Hightopp the Mad Hatter, Mallymkun the Dormouse, and Chess the Cheshire Cat. He appears a second time in the White Queen's kitchen, frantically cooking and throwing dishes. His third appearance is at the Frabjous Day scene, in which he stands with the other characters wielding a ladle as his weapon, nervous and somewhat ready to go to battle. Burton stated that because Whitehouse is a great comedic actor, a lot of his lines came from improvisation.

The March Hare appears in the "Mad T Party" in Disney's California Adventure park. He is based on the 2010 film's interpretation, and plays bass guitar. He is often found hopping around with Mallymkun the Dormouse on stage.

== In popular culture ==
- The March Hare was played by Charlie Ruggles in Alice in Wonderland.
- In SyFy's TV miniseries Alice, the March Hare is represented by the character Mad March, the Queen's favorite assassin. The Queen frequently had him killed, resulting in his head getting lost; the Carpenter replaces it with a robot rabbit head. Despite this, Mad March is still his old self, crass and (as liked by the Queen) a homicidal maniac.
- The March Hare is featured as the primary antagonist in the Once Upon a Time story "Tea Party in March" in the graphic novel Once Upon a Time: Out of the Past.
- In the song entitled "We Have Heaven" by the British rock group Yes, a lyric mantra is sung from beginning to end saying "Tell the Moon Dog, tell the March Hare...".
- In the game American McGee's Alice, the March Hare is portrayed as a victim of the Mad Hatter's insane experimentation. Both the Hare and the Dormouse have become clockwork cyborgs. He also appears in the sequel, Alice: Madness Returns where he and the Dormouse betray the Hatter to aid in the Dollmaker's plans by constructing the Infernal Train.
- In the video game adaptation of Tim Burton's Alice in Wonderland, Thackery Earwicket is a playable character. He uses his telekinesis to defeat the Bandersnatch.
- In the manga Alice in the Country of Hearts the March Hare is called Elliot March and is Blood Dupre's (the Hatter's) right-hand man. He isn't specifically crazy or mad, but has a quite violent attitude, almost killing Alice with his long-barrelled gun before being stopped by Blood.
- In the manga Pandora Hearts, the March Hare is a "Chain" whose "Contractor" is Reim Lunettes. It has the ability to fake death, which helps Reim to escape his attackers and proved to be so realistic that even his comrades have believed him really dead.
- In the Annette Ducharme song "Moral", she references the March Hare singing: "But you're frantic like the March Hare running round".
- The famous mnemonic for medical students regarding cholinergic toxicity revolves around the Alice in Wonderland characters - "Mad as a hatter, Hot as a hare, Blind as a bat, Dry as a cracker." (There are several variations on this mnemonic.)
- The March Hare is voiced by Asim Chaudhry in the 2024 animated movie The Night Before Christmas in Wonderland.
