= Scott Brooker =

British puppeteer

Scott Brooker is a British puppeteer, puppet maker, puppet designer.

== Career ==
Scott Brooker has many television, theatre and film credits as a puppet maker and puppeteer. One of his most well known work was for Spitting Image, where he spent thirteen years as head puppet maker. After leaving Spitting Image, Brooker worked with Jim Henson's Creature Shop as a designer and fabricator working on many of their productions, including Alice in Wonderland and Five Children and It. At the Creature Shop Brooker also helped design the Monkey from PG and for Disney Channel's The Raoul Show. Brooker has also designed many theatre productions, most notably David Wood's Guess How Much I Love You. and A Christmas Carol. As well as making puppets for commercials, films, television and theatre, Brooker also designed the lamb puppet to promote CLIC Sargent, a children cancer on charity. Brooker has also performed additional puppetry for the character of Rattus Rattus from Horrible Histories. Brooker assisted John Eccleston (Rattus' main operator) in operating Rattus for all episodes of Gory Games, a Horrible Histories game show spin off. Brooker is currently part of "Puppet Shack", a small organisation of puppet professionals (including Nigel Plaskitt, Guy Stevens, Paul Jomain and Jonathan Saville), who have worked for many TV, film and theatre productions. He has also made puppets for the BBC programme That Puppet Game Show and recently designed puppets and creatures for The Harry Hill Movie.

== Filmography ==
- Spitting Image
- The Harry Hill Movie
- That Puppet Game Show
- Peter and the Wolf: A Prokofiev Fantasy
- Alice in Wonderland
- Five Children and It
- Round the Bend
- Hi Five
- The Hitchhiker's Guide to the Galaxy
- Gory Games
- Horrible Histories
- Five Minutes More
- The Raoul Show
- The Winjin Pom
- Get Fresh
- Spitting Image Election Special
- The Man With No Title

== Theatre credits ==
- A Christmas Carol
- Guess How Much I Love You
- Treasure Island
- Dragon
- Doctor Dolittle
- Peter Pan
- The Three Musketeers
- Cinderella
- Dick Whittington
- Mother Goose
- Aladdin
- MOJO
