= The Mock Turtle's Song =

Poem by Lewis Carroll

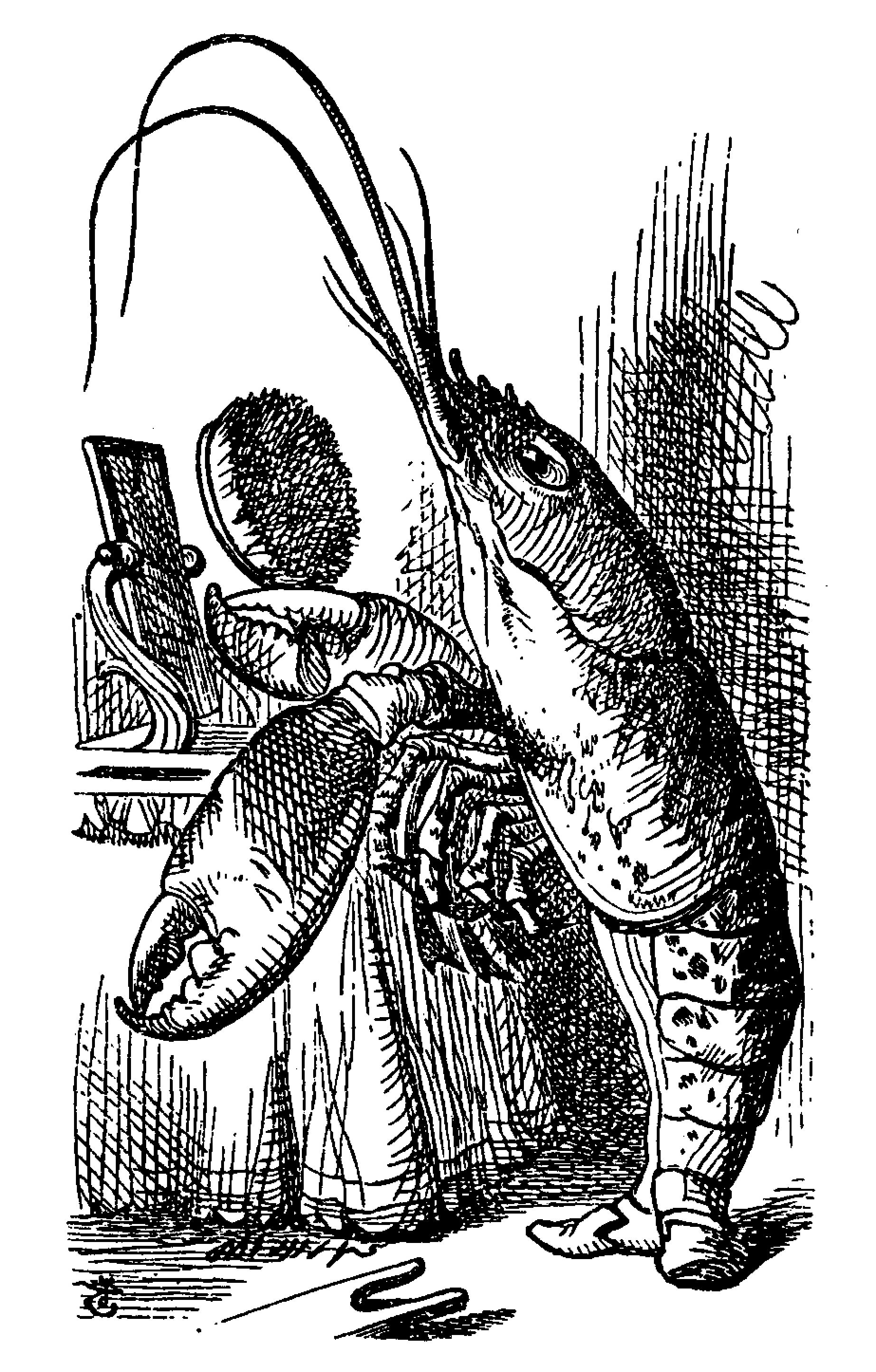

"The Mock Turtle's Song", also known as the "Lobster Quadrille", is a song recited by the Mock Turtle in Lewis Carroll's 1865 novel Alice's Adventures in Wonderland, accompanied by a dance. It was taught to him at school by his teacher called Tortoise.

== Context ==
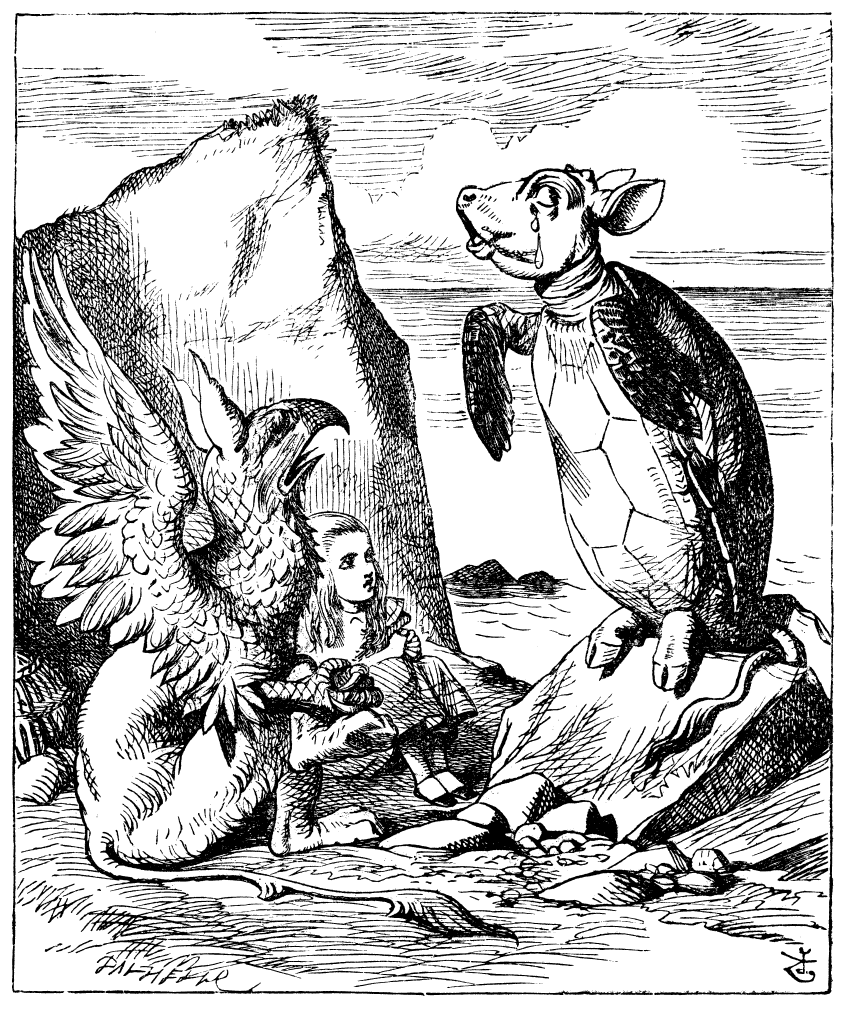
The Mock Turtle, The Gryphon and Alice

"The Lobster Quadrille" is a song written by Charles Lutwidge Dodgson (Lewis Carroll). It is a parody of "The Spider and the Fly" by Mary Botham Howitt. It appeared in Chapter 10 of Carroll's book Alice's Adventures in Wonderland, and was sung by a character in the book, the Mock Turtle.

The poem is very similar to "The Spider and the Fly" in its rhyme scheme, meter, and tone. The first lines of the two songs are as follows:

Will you walk a little faster said a whiting to a snail... (The Lobster Quadrille)

Will you walk into my parlour said a spider to a fly... (The Spider and the Fly)

The song fits into the flow of chapters 9 and 10, "The Mock Turtle's Story" and "The Lobster Quadrille", which are about the Mock Turtle's life and schooling under the sea. The whimsical lyrics feature animals such as porpoises, snails and lobsters. The snail is invited to join a dance in which he would be cast into the English Channel towards France, but he fearfully declines. The reason is left unspoken in the song, but France is known for its consumption of escargot.

== Lyrics ==
"Will you walk a little faster?" said a whiting to a snail,
"There's a porpoise close behind us, and he's treading on my tail.
See how eagerly the lobsters and the turtles all advance!
They are waiting on the shingle—will you come and join the dance?
Will you, won't you, will you, won't you, will you join the dance?
Will you, won't you, will you, won't you, won't you join the dance?

"You can really have no notion how delightful it will be
When they take us up and throw us, with the lobsters, out to sea!"
But the snail replied "Too far, too far!" and gave a look askance—
Said he thanked the whiting kindly, but he would not join the dance.
Would not, could not, would not, could not, would not join the dance.
Would not, could not, would not, could not, could not join the dance.

"What matters it how far we go?" his scaly friend replied,
"There is another shore, you know, upon the other side.
The further off from England the nearer is to France—
Then turn not pale, beloved snail, but come and join the dance.
Will you, won't you, will you, won't you, will you join the dance?
Will you, won't you, will you, won't you, won't you join the dance?"

== Settings ==
The song was performed by Franz Ferdinand (band) for the 2010 film Alice in Wonderland. The song was featured in the film's soundtrack.

The song was performed by the band The Four Postmen on their 1997 album Looking for Grandpa in an upbeat modern style.

The song was performed by the punk rock band Feederz on their 1986 album Teachers in Space.

The song was performed by Donald Fagen and Walter Becker (with Becker doing the lead vocals) as part of a number of demo songs recorded before they formed the band Steely Dan.

The song was set for chorus by Irving Fine in his "Three Choruses from Alice in Wonderland" (1942).

The poem was set to music by György Ligeti in his "Nonsense Madrigals" (1988/93).

The song is sung by a chorus to the "real" Alice in the 1985 film Dreamchild.

The song was included on The Simon Sisters' children's album, The Simon Sisters Sing the Lobster Quadrille and Other Songs for Children (1969).

The song was sung by Gene Wilder and later Tina Majorino in the 1999 film Alice in Wonderland as the Mock Turtle

The song was performed by Michael Hordern, as the Mock Turtle, and Spike Milligan, as the Gryphon, in the 1972 film Alice's Adventures in Wonderland, set to music by John Barry.

The song was performed by Bread, Love and Dreams https://www.youtube.com/results?search_query=bread+love+and+dreams+lobster+quadrille.
