= Alice in Wonderland (1985 film) =

1985 two-part film directed by Harry Harris

- DVD cover
- Genre: Adventure; Family; Fantasy; Musical
- Based on: Alice's Adventures in Wonderland and Through the Looking-Glass by Lewis Carroll
- Written by: Lewis Carroll; Paul Zindel
- Directed by: Harry Harris
- Starring: Cast: Sheila Allen Steve Allen Scott Baio Ernest Borgnine Beau Bridges Lloyd Bridges Red Buttons Sid Caesar Carol Channing Imogene Coca Sammy Davis Jr. Patrick Duffy George Gobel Eydie Gormé Natalie Gregory Merv Griffin Sherman Hemsley Ann Jillian Arte Johnson Harvey Korman Steve Lawrence Karl Malden Roddy McDowall Jayne Meadows Donna Mills Pat Morita Robert Morley Anthony Newley Louis Nye Donald O'Connor Martha Raye Telly Savalas John Stamos Ringo Starr Sally Struthers Jack Warden Jonathan Winters Shelley Winters
- Theme music composer: Stephen Deutsch; Morton Stevens
- Country of origin: United States
- Original language: English

Production
- Producer: Irwin Allen
- Production locations: 880 La Loma Rd., Pasadena, California; Metro-Goldwyn-Mayer Studios - 10202 W. Washington Blvd., Culver City, California
- Cinematography: Fred J. Koenekamp
- Editor: Richard E. Rabjohn
- Running time: 187 minutes
- Production companies: Irwin Allen Productions; Columbia Pictures Television

Original release
- Network: CBS
- Release: December 9 – December 10, 1985

Alice in Wonderland is a 1985 American two-part made-for-television adventure family fantasy musical film based on Lewis Carroll's classic books Alice's Adventures in Wonderland (1865) and Through the Looking-Glass (1871). An Irwin Allen production, it used a huge all-star cast of notable actors and actresses. The title role was played by Natalie Gregory, who wore a blonde wig for this miniseries. Alice in Wonderland was first broadcast on December 9, 1985 (part one), and December 10, 1985 (part two), at 8:00pm EST on CBS.

It was filmed in Los Angeles at the MGM Studios (now known as Sony Pictures Studios) in Culver City over a 55-day period from March 12, 1985, to May 28 of that same year. Additional filming took place at Malibu Beach for the oysters scene, and establishing shots of Alice's house took place at the S. S. Hinds Estate, also in the Los Angeles area.

== Plot ==
=== Part 1 – Alice in Wonderland ===
After helping her mother set the table for tea time, Alice goes outside to see her sister and play with her kitten, Dinah. The White Rabbit comes running by, saying he's late. Wondering where he is going, Alice follows him and tumbles into his hole.

Alice finds herself in a hall with many doors, all of them locked. On a table is a key which she can use to open one small door. A small bottle appears labeled "Drink Me." By drinking from the bottle, she shrinks to the right size for the door, but can no longer reach the key to open it. She then eats a little cake, which makes her grow to over nine feet tall. Frustrated, Alice begins to cry. The White Rabbit appears, but frightened of the giant Alice, runs away, dropping his fan and gloves. Using the fan makes Alice shrink again, which takes her diving in her pool of tears, where she meets The Lory Bird, The Dodo Bird and the Mouse, who tells her why he hates dogs and cats ("I Hate Dogs and Cats").

The White Rabbit mistakes Alice for his housemaid Mary Ann and orders her to go get his fan and gloves from his house. While searching his house, Alice finds another "Drink Me" bottle, which makes her grow to nine feet tall once again. Angry at Alice, the rabbit and his butler Pat the Guinea Pig begin throwing berries at her, which turn into little cakes. She eats one and shrinks to back to size. After running away, she meets the Caterpillar who tells her the story "You are Old, Father William". She then meets The Duchess and her cook; the Cheshire Cat, who tells her "There's No Way Home"; and the Mad Hatter, March Hare, and Dormouse having an outdoor tea party ("Laugh"). Alice runs off back on her quest for the White Rabbit, and meets a baby fawn in the forest, the only normal thing she's seen so far ("Why Do People Act as If They're Crazy?").

Alice stumbles upon a doorway that leads to the rose garden of the Queen of Hearts, who always yells "Off with her Head!" She leaves to visit the Gryphon and Mock Turtle ("Nonsense"), but then she is called to attend the trial of the Knave of Hearts, who is accused of having stolen The Queen's tarts. Alice stands up to the Queen and is forced to flee the court. She trips and falls and finds herself back home.

Alice runs inside, only to discover herself trapped on the other side of the mirror. She notices a large book next to her and starts reading a poem called Jabberwocky about a scary monster, a dragon called the Jabberwock. The lights go out, and the Jabberwock appears in the house.

=== Part 2 – Through the Looking-Glass ===
The Jabberwock disappears as Alice hides behind the chessboard, knocking it over. As she places the pieces back on the table, she realizes they are all alive, but can't hear her. Desperate for a clue, Alice looks around the room and sees a painting of an Owl, which comes to life and explains that the Jabberwock is a creation of Alice's own childish fears, which she must overcome in order with the courage to return to the real world.

Alice has an interesting conversation with some talking flowers and meets The Red Queen from the chess set, now human-sized. The Red Queen tells Alice that she is now a pawn in a giant game of chess. Once Alice reaches the eighth square to become a queen, she can go home. She boards a train to the fourth square, where she meets the gnat and then Tweedledum and Tweedledee, who teach her the proper way to "Shake Hands" and sing the story of "The Walrus and the Carpenter". She meets The White Queen ("Jam Tomorrow, Jam Yesterday") and Humpty Dumpty. The Jabberwock appears again and knocks Humpty Dumpty off of his wall.

Alice meets The White King and his messenger, who bring Alice to see "The Lion and the Unicorn" as they fight for the crown. The Lion and the Unicorn call a temporary truce and Alice hands out a tray of Looking-Glass Cake, which must be passed around first, then cut after. She is captured by the Red Knight and rescued by the White Knight, who sings and dances her all the way to the eighth square ("We are Dancing"). She meets up with the Red Queen and White Queen, who have a few "Queenly" tests ("Can You do Addition") and some words of wisdom for her ("Emotions"). The White Queen falls asleep on Alice's lap and the Red Queen sings her a lullaby ("Hush-a-bye Lady"). Alice finds her way to her castle, where a great feast has been set in her honor ("To the Looking-Glass World").

A present is brought to her, out of which comes The Jabberwock. The Owl tells her to act brave. Alice finds her way back to the mirror and into her home, where she confronts The Jabberwock, telling him that he is just in her imagination and that she does not believe in him. In a billow of red smoke and lightning, the Jabberwock disappears this time for good. Alice slumps into a chair and is woken up by her Mother calling Alice to tea. When Alice heads upstairs to change for tea, she sees her Wonderland family in the mirror, and they bid farewell to her ("Alice").

== Cast ==
In order of appearance.

Part 1 – Alice in Wonderland

- Natalie Gregory as Alice
- Sheila Allen as Mother
- Sharee Gregory as Sister
- Red Buttons as The White Rabbit
- Sherman Hemsley as The Mouse
- Donald O'Connor as The Lory Bird
- Charles Dougherty as The Duck
- Shelley Winters as The Dodo Bird
- Billy Braver as The Eaglet
- Scott Baio as Pat the Pig
- Ernie F. Orsatti as Bill the Lizard
- Sammy Davis Jr. as The Caterpillar/Father William
- Scotch Byerley as Fish Footman
- Robert Axelrod as Frog Footman
- Martha Raye as The Duchess
- Imogene Coca as The Cook
- Telly Savalas as The Cheshire Cat
- Anthony Newley as The Mad Hatter
- Roddy McDowall as The March Hare
- Arte Johnson as The Dormouse
- Lana Beeson as Alice (singing) (uncredited)
- Michael Chieffo as Two of Spades
- Jeffrey Winner as Five of Spades
- John Walter Davis as Seven of Spades
- Jayne Meadows as The Queen of Hearts
- Robert Morley as The King of Hearts
- James Joseph Galante as Knave of Hearts
- Selma Archerd as The Queen of Diamonds
- George Savalas as The Courtier
- Candace Savalas as The Lady in Waiting
- Sid Caesar as The Gryphon
- Ringo Starr as The Mock Turtle
- Jordan Troy as The Black Cat
- Tom McLoughlin as Jabberwocky

Part 2 – Through The Looking-Glass

- Tom McLoughlin as Jabberwocky
- Natalie Gregory as Alice
- Ann Jillian as Red Queen
- Patrick Culliton as Red King
- Carol Channing as White Queen
- Harvey Korman as White King
- Jack Warden as The Owl
- Sally Struthers as The Tiger Lily
- Donna Mills as The Rose
- Laura Carlson as The Daisy
- Merv Griffin as The Conductor
- Patrick Duffy as The Goat
- Steve Allen as The Gentleman in Paper Suit
- Pat Morita as The Horse
- George Gobel as The Gnat
- Eydie Gormé as Tweedle Dee
- Steve Lawrence as Tweedle Dum
- Karl Malden as The Walrus
- Louis Nye as The Carpenter
- Kristi Lynes as Oyster #1
- Desiree Sbazo as Oyster #2
- Barbi Alison as Oyster #3
- Janie Walton as Oyster #4
- Jonathan Winters as Humpty Dumpty
- John Stamos as The Messenger
- Ernest Borgnine as The Lion
- Beau Bridges as The Unicorn
- Dee Brantlinger as The Lady of the Court
- Don Matheson as The Red Knight
- Lloyd Bridges as The White Knight
- Red Buttons as The White Rabbit
- Jayne Meadows as The Queen of Hearts
- Robert Morley as The King of Hearts
- James Joseph Galante as Knave of Hearts
- Anthony Newley as The Mad Hatter
- Roddy McDowall as The March Hare
- Arte Johnson as The Dormouse
- Sheila Allen as Mother

== Musical numbers ==
(All Musical Numbers composed by Steve Allen)

Part 1 – Alice in Wonderland

- "I Hate Dogs and Cats" – Sherman Hemsley
- "You Are Old, Father William" – Sammy Davis Jr.
- "There's Something To Say For Hatred" – Martha Raye & Imogene Coca
- "There's No Way Home" – Telly Savalas
- "Laugh" – Anthony Newley
- "Why Do People…?" – Lana Beeson (Uncredited for Natalie Gregory)
- "Off With Their Heads" – Jayne Meadows feat. Robert Morley
- "Nonsense" – Ringo Starr
- "I Didn't; You Did!" – Anthony Newley and Roddy McDowall

Part 2 – Alice Through The Looking-Glass

- "How Do You Do, Shake Hands" – Eydie Gormé and Steve Lawrence
- "The Walrus and the Carpenter" – Steve Lawrence, Eydie Gormé, Karl Malden, Louis Nye and the Oysters
- "Jam Tomorrow" – Carol Channing
- "The Lion and the Unicorn" – Harvey Korman, John Stamos, and Natalie Gregory
- "We Are Dancing" – Lloyd Bridges and Natalie Gregory
- "Can You Do Addition?" – Ann Jillian and Carol Channing
- "Emotions" – Ann Jillian
- "Hush-A-Bye Lady" – Ann Jillian
- "To The Looking-Glass World" – Red Buttons, Lana Beeson, and Company
- "Alice" – Company

== Ratings ==
The miniseries was a modest success during its original airing. Out of 71 shows, part 1 ranked at 13, and came in at 21.2 points out of a 31-point share. Part 2 ranked at 35, and came in at 16.8 points out of a 25-point share. In total, the miniseries averaged 19 points out of a 28-point share. Part 1 won easily from 8-9 P.M. opposite Hardcastle and McCormick on ABC, and TV's Bloopers and Practical Jokes on NBC. From 9–9:30 p.m., part 1 was 0.6 points ahead of Monday Night Football on ABC.

== In popular culture ==
The Jabberwocky and the White Knight suits went on to be reused as "The Reluctant Dragon" and "Sir Giles the Knight" in the 1986 musical TV film adaptation of Kenneth Grahame's The Reluctant Dragon, produced by Irwin Allen Productions, with Michael Sorich as the voice of the Dragon, and Lloyd Bridges as Sir Giles.

The costumes for the Mad Hatter, the March Hare, the Dormouse, the King of Hearts, the Rose, and the Gentleman in the Paper Suit were used in the Halloween party sequence for the 1993 Disney film, Hocus Pocus.

== Home media ==
Warner Home Video first released the film on VHS in 1986. A 1993 release split the parts for individual sale, edited to eliminate the original cliffhanger: Part One ended with an onscreen quote from the final chapter of the first novel as Alice ran happily towards her home; Part Two, released as Alice Through the Looking Glass, began with the final minutes trimmed from the previous installment.

Sony Pictures Home Entertainment released the film on DVD in August 2006, restoring the original TV broadcast edit.
