= The Winjin' Pom =

- Starring: Adèle Anderson; Mark Arden; Roger Blake; Stephen Frost; Alison Jiear; Nigel Pegram; Kate Robbins; Michael Robbins; Peter Spraggon; William Todd-Jones
- Country of origin: United Kingdom
- No. of seasons: 1
- No. of episodes: 6

Production
- Running time: 30 minutes per episode

Original release
- Network: ITV Central (CITV)
- Release: 16 March – 20 April 1991

The Winjin' Pom is a television puppet series about a talking British caravan, renowned for his moaning, and five Australians who live and travel in him. The travellers who include Adelaide, Sydney, Bruce, Frazer, and Darwin (respectively a wallaby, an ostrich, a spider, a fruit bat, and a wombat), are members of the Gullagaloona backpackers club and are on a mission to travel the world.

Discovering the caravan near London when lost, the travellers soon find the Winjin' Pom to be one of their biggest allies. A mafia-like team headed by evil Hammond organ playing vulture J.G. Chicago discover the caravan's ability to speak and decide to hijack it in a sinister plot to make themselves rich.

Part of this mafia gang includes two villainous crows, who are brothers. Ronnie and Reggie ("The Crows") relentlessly chase the caravan and follow the backpackers on their travels in an attempt to steal it, always, of course, failing miserably.

The Winjin' Pom (the name is a pun on the "whinging pom", an Aussie expression used to refer to a person of British origin who constantly complains about things he has to face) caravan is famous not only for talking but also for flying, something which occurs several episodes in after a hijack by The Crows. This talking-flying caravan was not seen by many people and the series did not air for long.

Written by Richard Carpenter the television series appears to be aimed at teenagers, while it actually contains some impressive dialogue that convey a certain grittiness now and then, making it similar in spirit to The Simpsons TV show. The series particularly revolves around the friendly, joking banter on stereotypes: the grumpy Brit and adventurous Australian.

The Winjin' Pom was broadcast in 1991 on commercial television and is owned by Spitting Image Productions and HIT Entertainment PLC. It was directed by Steve Bendelack and is not currently shown on any television network, nor is it available to own on video or DVD. Allegedly, the rights are available for purchase. At the time of the show's transmission, there was a novelisation written by Doctor Who writer Terrance Dicks and a tie-in magazine published by TriStar Publications.

== Main characters ==
=== Heroes ===
- The Winjin' Pom: a talking, flying British van who transports his friends. Depressive, pessimistic, and prone to self-pitying, Pom tends to see everything in a negative light, but he is nonetheless loyal to his friends, and it is often up to him to save the day when they're in a pinch.
- Adelaide: a boyish female wallaby and the unofficial leader of the bunch; cranky and quick to retort, she's a real tomboy and could be seen as a feminist, compared to the more feminine Sydney. Adelaide is also skilled in mechanics and can be seen repairing Pom now and then. Named after Adelaide, a city in Australia.
- Sydney: a snobbish female ostrich with a taste for bragging and luxury... She complains a lot, and equally seems to annoy the others in return. She's usually the first one to duck and cover in case of danger, usually stuffing her head into a fireman's bucket. She also insists on being referred to as a cassowary, and not an ostrich. Named after Sydney, Australia's largest city.
- Darwin: a middle-aged male wombat, Darwin is probably the most sensitive of the group, being an amateur poet and romantic. Clumsy, naive to a fault, and easily bewildered, he seems to get on Adelaide and Sydney's nerves a lot, and gets repeatedly called a wimp by his mates. Named after Charles Darwin, famous for his theory of evolution.
- Frazer: a male fruit bat with a laid-back attitude. A good-hearted, tolerant young guy, Frazer is a cricket fanatic and has a taste for bananas. He's also good friend with Bruce. Named after Charles Fraser, a 19th-century botanist and explorer of Australia.
- Bruce: an enthusiastic, wisecracking redback spider, Bruce's humour is just as deadly as his venom... Though loyal to his friends, he is a troublemaker and tends to annoy them somewhat, save for Frazer who seems to appreciate him. Upon meeting someone for the first time, Bruce's first question is usually "Can I bite him?"

=== Villains ===
- J.G. Chicago: the heroes' main nemesis, a cold-hearted, calculating vulture who seems to be a sort of powerful underworld boss. A lover of opera, he is sustained by a complex medical apparatus and enjoys playing Hammond organ. J.G. is bent on stealing the Winjin' Pom and using his special abilities for his own benefits.
- Ronnie and Reggie, the Crow Twins: a pair of nasty but single-minded crows, Ronnie and Reggie are twin brothers, and J.G.'s snivelling, incompetent associates. They occasionally manage to hijack the Winjin' Pom, but systematically end up failing. Named after the Kray Twins, the famous London gangland mobsters.
- Howard: a male spotted hyena and J.G.'s right hand. Somewhat clumsy and less evil that he'd want to let believe, he has a knack for putting himself into impossible situations. Poor Howard is also clearly terrified by J.G. and appears a little pathetic when he has to face his boss' outbursts of anger.

== Episodes ==
1. The Gullagaloona Backpackers arrive in London to collect their inheritance from their founder. They fortuitously stumble across the Winjin' Pom and get him working. However, two gangsters, Ronnie and Reggie Crow are themselves after the van, having left something in it. They finally reach Windsor, albeit too late to collect the inheritance.

2. The loot left by the Crows inside the Pom turns out to be an old, scratched record of a famous Australian opera singer, which the vulture crime lord J.G. Chicago is coveting. After being wrongly put in jail by the pigs cops and escaping thanks to Bruce, the Gullagaloona backpackers return the stolen item to its rightful owner, the old Lady Studemare, who rewards them by allowing them to listen to the record, much to their chagrin.

3. The travellers decide to sell the Pom after he puts them in trouble with a duo of vicious bull bikers, thus replacing him with a similar-looking campervan. Fortunately, it comes in handy to fool Ronnie, Reggie and Howard.

4. The backpackers arrive at a bed and breakfast that turns out to be haunted. However, Ronnie and Reggie have followed them, trying to get their hands once more on the campervan. Unexpected help comes from Raymond and Mavis, two ghost bats who are distant relatives of Frazer.

5. While being chased by the Crows, the Pom hides in a scrapyard. However, the vehicle is accidentally placed in an incinerator. To escape, Pom shrinks himself and the others inside (although Bruce escapes). Within 12 hours they will be back to normal size. However, Ronnie and Reggie see this as the perfect opportunity to please their boss, J.G. Chicago.

6. The Crows kidnap Adelaide as part of a plan by J.G. Chicago to lure the backpackers and Pom into a trap. Afterwards, the vulture cajoles the campervan into working for him. Will he realise where his true loyalties lie?

== Credits ==
Created by Spitting Image and Richard Carpenter
Puppets created by: Scott Brooker
Puppets made by: Mick Hockney, Stephen Mansfield, Susan Moore, Jonathan Saville, Julien Short, Guy Stevens and The Spitting Image Workshop
Pom Van by Art Effects
Performers: Antony Asbury, Richard Coombs, Philip Eason, David Greenaway, Barnaby Harrison, Kaefan Shaw, William Todd-Jones, Francis Wright
Script Editor: Paul Mayhew-Archer
Additional Material: John Langdon
Music Composed and Arranged by: Simon Brint, Roddy Matthews with Richard Vranch (eps 2 & 4)
Miniature Visual Effects: Steve Archer, Jamie Campbell, Roger Jones, Gordon Tait, Simon Margetts
Visual Effects Co-ordinator: Peter Thornton
Costume Supervisors: Jackie Hallatt, Frances Hill
Scenic Effects: Steve Weston, Loraine Marshall
Art Director: Phil Harvey
Production Buyer: Jille Brown-Azis
Property Master: Allen Polley
Studio Sound: Ted Scott
Stage Manager: Gail Berryman
Production Accountant: Brian Brockwell
Production Secretary: Philippa Wood
Production Manager: Alison Taggart
First Assistant Director: Simon Haveland
Production Assistant: Sue Taylor
Camera Supervisor: Tony Keene
Post Production Sound: Steve Hellaby
Videotape Editor: Mykola Pawluk
Director of Photography: John Henshall
Production Designer: Anne Tilby
Associate Producer: Candida Julian-Jones
Executive Producers: Roger Law, William Sargent
Produced by: Marcus Mortimer
