= Gryphon (Alice's Adventures in Wonderland) =

Fictional character from Alice in Wonderland

- Alice character
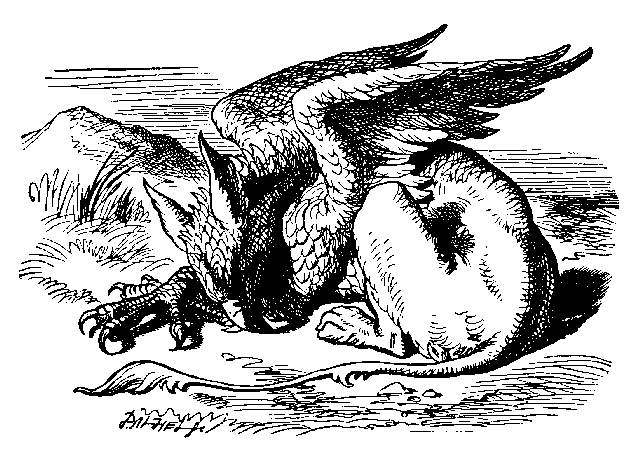
- The Gryphon, illustrated by John Tenniel
- First appearance: Alice's Adventures in Wonderland
- Created by: Lewis Carroll

In-universe information
- Species: Gryphon
- Gender: Male
- Nationality: Wonderland

The Gryphon is a fictional character devised by Lewis Carroll in the popular 1865 book Alice's Adventures in Wonderland. True to the conventional view of a griffin, he has the head, talons, and wings of an eagle and the body of a lion.

== Role and personality ==
The Gryphon appears to be somewhat overbearing and dismissive of the obsessions and dismays of other characters, such as the Mock Turtle's sorrow and the Queen of Hearts' executions, neither of which (according to the Gryphon) have any basis in fact. He speaks with a slightly ungrammatical Cockney-like accent and makes demands of the Mock Turtle, which are obeyed despite the latter creature's implicit objections. In addition, he is prone to making cough-like sounds written as "Hjckrrh!", which seem to have little meaning and may be involuntary.

In Alice's Adventures in Wonderland, the Gryphon features with the Mock Turtle in Chapter 9, "The Mock Turtle's Story", Chapter 10, "The Lobster Quadrille", and briefly at the start of Chapter 11, "Who Stole the Tarts?". The Gryphon was ordered by the Queen to take Alice to meet the Mock Turtle; this he did, and stayed with them for a long time, demanding that the Mock Turtle tell its history, as well as several poems. The two creatures go on to explain certain features of their world which are apparently nonsense to Alice, before Alice and the Gryphon are summoned to a criminal trial, leaving the Mock Turtle behind.

== In other media ==
=== Films ===
- The Gryphon appeared in the 1931 Alice in Wonderland, played by Charles Silvern.
- The Gryphon appeared in the 1933 Alice in Wonderland, played by William Austin.
  The Gryphon from a Jell-O commercial
- The Gryphon was to be featured in Disney's 1951 Alice in Wonderland, but the part was deleted. However, he and the Mock Turtle appeared along with Alice in a Jell-O commercial.
- The Gryphon appeared in the 1966 Alice in Wonderland TV film, played by Malcolm Muggeridge.
- The Gryphon appeared in the 1972 Alice in Wonderland film, played by Spike Milligan.
- The Gryphon appeared in the 1985 Alice in Wonderland film, played by Sid Caesar.
- The Gryphon is absent in the 1988 Alice in Wonderland film, with the Dodo replacing his role in the story.
- The Gryphon appeared in Dreamchild, performed by Ron Mueck and voiced by Fulton Mackay.
- The Gryphon appeared in the 1999 Alice in Wonderland TV film voiced by Donald Sinden. The Gryphon was operated by David Alan Barclay, Adrian Getley, and Robert Tygner.
- In the 2010 Alice in Wonderland film, the Gryphon appeared as an "in memoriam" drawing on the wall of the Red Queen's palace, having been killed by the Jabberwock.
- The Gryphon makes a silent cameo in the 2024 animated movie The Night Before Christmas in Wonderland.

=== Video games ===
- Gryphon appeared in the video game American McGee's Alice, voiced by Andrew Chaikin. Gryphon is portrayed as a noble creature that tries to help Alice and is killed by the Jabberwocky. He is later revived after Alice defeats the Queen of Hearts. In the sequel Alice Madness Returns, he died by unknown means (possibly from being consumed by the Ruin) which his friend the Mock Turtle made a ship named "HMS Gryphon" in memory. Alice then meets with the Mock Turle to escort her to Deluded Depths to see the Walrus and Carpenter, the transport was successful but at the cost getting the ship destroyed by Shipwreck Sharks.
- Gryphon appeared in the Sunsoft's 2006 mobile game Alice's Warped Wonderland (歪みの国のアリス, Yugami no kuni no Arisu; Alice in Distortion World). Depending on the player's choice, Gryphon is found in the forest by the Queen of Hearts' castle and helps Ariko (the "Alice" of the game) by giving her a ride on his back. In the game, the snake tail is Gryphon's "head" while the avian head is his rear. While the eagle head is animalistic, the snake tail is capable of speech and talks to Ariko in a fatherly manner.

=== Others ===
- In the anime and manga series Pandora Hearts, Gryphon is a chain for Xai Vessalius who is also similar to the Gryphon in the book.
