= The Spooks of Bottle Bay =

- Genre: Children's
- Created by: Ian Allen
- Country of origin: United Kingdom
- No. of series: 3
- No. of episodes: 39

Production
- Producer: Fugitive/Playboard Puppets
- Running time: 15 minutes

Original release
- Network: ITV (CITV)
- Release: 9 September 1993 – 8 December 1995

The Spooks of Bottle Bay was a children's drama series shown between the years of 1993 and 1995 on CITV. The stories behind the show were created by Ian Allen of Button Moon fame, and the puppets and sets were designed by John Thirtle. The series was directed by Paul Cole. Thirtle died just before studio work began on the third and final season. Allen and Thirtle's Playboard Puppets company also gave live performances using The Spooks of Bottle Bay puppets.

== Plot ==
The Spooks of Bottle Bay followed the adventures of nice-guy Sidney Sludge and his dog Maxwell, and the town folk of Bottle Bay. The town was in fact located in a bottle on a mantelpiece of an unknown person's house. The residents are forever plagued by Sidney's evil siblings, Sybil and Cedric. Sidney spent most of the time trying to avoid the problems caused by his brother and sister and was always helped, albeit unwittingly, by the Spooks of Bottle Bay.

== Characters ==
- Sidney Malcolm Sludge (Nigel Plaskitt): The lead character of the series. A good-natured, friendly and honest, if sometimes slow-witted, young man, his adventures include looking for jobs around Bottle Bay, and even finding love on one occasion. He spends much of his time avoiding the crimes of his evil brother and sister, Sybil and Cedric. He technically also owns part of the estate agents his siblings run as his father left it to them all but this is never acknowledged by his sibling except for the pilot. He lived in a beach hut in the first series but by series two was staying at the Seaview Guest House, to try to avoid his siblings. Sid delivers his catch-phrase "Now that's spooky!" at the end of each episode in Series Two and Three.
- Sybil Melanie Sludge (Francis Wright and Simon Buckley): The green skinned, flame haired sister of Sidney. She is, along with Cedric, the main antagonist of the show. Sybil spends her time plotting thefts, and also trying to defeat the Spooks in the later episodes. The Spooks, however, always managed to outwit her, no matter how clever her plans were.
- Cedric Montague Sludge (John Thirtle and Richard Coombs): The brother of Sybil and Sid, Cedric tended to help his sister with her schemes, rather than coming up with his own. He does, however, match his sister in ruthlessness – he will do anything to get rich. He is also manager/owner of the bottle bay pier.
- Maxwell: Maxi is a blue bulldog and is Sidney's loyal companion. Cedric sometimes fought Sidney for ownership of Maxwell.
- Sally Spook (Louise Gold and Heather Tobias): She is, along with Fred Spook, the leader of the Spooks of Bottle Bay and mother to Baby Spook.
- Fred Spook (John Thirtle): One of the leaders of the gang of ghosts that are out to foil the evil plots of Cybil and Cedric.
- Baby Spook (Ian Allen and Simon Buckley): Baby Spook is a ghost who lives with Fred and Sally in the House on the Hill.
- Betty Bat: A bat who lives in the House on the Hill with Fred, Sally and Baby Spook.
- Tommy (Phil Eason): Tommy is a Spook who wears a red hat and always has a smile on his face. He lives at the Sea View Guest House. Despite his rather creepy appearance and mischievous personality, he is very much on the side of good. He sometimes secretly helps out Sidney Sludge, particularly when he is a victim of his siblings' misdeeds, and always helps to thwart Sybil and Cedric when needed.
- Ted and Lily Turine (Phil Eason and Steve Nallon): Ted and Lily own the Seaview Guest House, where Sid stays.
- Iris: Lily's identical twin sister who visits Seaview Guest House in one episode.
- Madge (Sue Dacre): The housekeeper at the Seaview Guest House.
- Gran: An old woman who takes a shine to Sid. She owns a cat called Norman.
- Joe (Phil Eason): Seaman who takes care of the Mermaid Molly galleon moored in the harbour. Owns a parrot called 'Bananas'.
- Duchess of Dingledale (Steve Nallon): Royalty who visited prestigious events in Bottle Bay. She awarded prizes at the Bottle Bay Dog Show and the Talent Show on the pier, and also attended the party on the Galleon, where Sybil attempted to steal her diamonds.
- Bella Butler (Heather Tobias): Bella owns The Happy Plaice, the fish and chip shop in Bottle Bay.
- Lucy Spook (Heather Tobias): Lucy is Sally's best friend, who lives in the antique shop.
- Nancy Spook (Nigel Plaskitt): Nancy is an Irish spook who lives in the launderette, who often babysits for Baby Spook whilst Sally is at night school.
- Daphy (Steve Nallon): Another Spook character. She is bright pink and wears a pair of green glasses and is very well-spoken. Daphy lives with Tommy at the Sea View Guest House, where Sidney lived with his dog Maxi.
- Damask the Highwayman (Nigel Plaskitt): The ghost of a Highwayman, whom Sally encounters in series one. He unwittingly foils Cedric's plan to steal millions of pounds from Sybil.
- Brenda Drain (Heather Tobias): Sid's girlfriend.

Other spooks include Bed Bug Willy Spook (Ian Allen) and the School Master (Nigel Plaskitt) spook who led the night school that many of the younger ghosts attended. Captain Patch, (Nigel Plaskitt) one of the many spooks who haunted the galleon moored in the harbour, was called upon by Sally and Fred in order to stop Sybil from stealing the Duchess of Dingledale's (Steve Nallon) diamonds.

Other residents of Bottle Bay have also appeared in various episodes, including the Punch and Judy man, Bill, who performs on the pier; the Bottle Bay hairdresser, whose salon was invaded by Sybil in an attempt to find out where Sidney was living; and PC Twopence, the Bottle Bay police officer.

== Episodes ==
=== Season 1 ===
1. Meet the Spooks
2. Sniffing Out Spooks
3. Spook in the Post
4. To Catch A Cat
5. Shock For Lucy Spook
6. Spooks in Distress
7. Cedric's Revenge
8. Treasure in the Attic
9. Spooks at Sea
10. The Tale of Betty Bat
11. Baby Spook Goes An Oo-ing!
12. Spook Spotting
13. Spooks Will Be Spooks

=== Season 2 ===
1. Picking Up The Pieces
2. A Spooky Party
3. A Bug in the Bath
4. Doggy Trail|
5. Clowning on the Pier
6. Sid's Birthday
7. Trick or Treat
8. Brenda Drain
9. Spooky Dancers
10. Where's Margaret
11. Balancing Act
12. Flying Baby Spook
13. That's Spooky

=== Season 3 ===
1. Bumper Cars
2. Spooks Ashore
3. Mermaid Molly
4. How Many Oohs
5. A Date of Tommy
6. Fabulous Feet
7. Sally's Spooky Dance
8. Just the Taps
9. Do Wop Bop
10. Bad Luck Frog
11. Tap Dance Hall
12. Anyone Knows
13. Cheer Up

== Music ==
- Spooky Musicals (2004-03-18)

== Home media ==
- Spooks of Bottle Bay All Season 1 Episodes (2004-10-10)
- Spooks of Bottle Bay All Season 2 Episodes (2004-10-10)
- Spooks of Bottle Bay Eleven Season 3 Episodes (2004-10-10)
