= Nigel Plaskitt =

British actor (born 1950)

- Born: 27 July 1950 (age 76); England
- Occupations: Actor; director; puppeteer; producer
- Years active: 1975–present
- Website: www.nigelplaskitt.com

Nigel Plaskitt (born 27 July 1950) is an English actor, puppeteer, producer, and stage and television director.

== Career ==
His voice and puppetry talents have appeared on television shows such as Pipkins (for which he provided the narration, as well as voicing and operating the characters of Hartley Hare and Tortoise), Spitting Image and New Captain Scarlet. He has also contributed to films, such as Labyrinth, The Muppet Christmas Carol, Muppet Treasure Island, Muppets Most Wanted, and The Hitchhiker's Guide to the Galaxy.

Plaskitt appeared as Unstoffe in the four-part Doctor Who science-fiction serial The Ribos Operation in 1978.

In British television advertisements, Plaskitt appeared as the character Malcolm, a young man suffering from a heavy cold, in a series of commercials for Vicks Sinex nasal spray from 1972 to 1981 and a one-off revival commercial in 1993. He is also the puppeteer behind the ITV Digital/PG Tips Monkey with Sue Beattie and Ben Miller.

He also narrated The Rev. W. Awdry's letter to Christopher at the beginning of some UK and US broadcasts of Thomas and Friends.

He has also been puppet coach and puppet director for the British Theatre, staging the UK tour of Doctor Dolittle, resident puppet consultant on the West End production of Avenue Q, and director of several shows — including Spitting Image colleague Louise Gold's cabaret act.

He also was involved with the Gorillaz Demon Days: Live at the Manchester Opera House on 1–5 November 2005, as a PA for the puppets of Murdoc and 2D when they came out in the beginning of the show. The puppets of Murdoc and 2-D reappeared after the Main Set was over when the curtains fell after their choral outro, Demon Days, and they egged on the audience for an encore and the curtains then rose to an encore of Hong Kong and Latin Simone.

== Filmography ==
=== Film ===
- Spy Story (1976) - Mason
- Charleston (1977) - Hotel Receptionist (uncredited)
- The Killing Edge (1984) - Man from labour camp
- Labyrinth (1985) - Additional Muppet Performer
- Little Shop of Horrors (1986) - Plant Pod Performer
- The Muppet Christmas Carol (1992) - Additional Muppet Performer
- Muppet Treasure Island (1996) - Additional Muppet Performer and Coordinator
- Lost in Space (1998) Robot team
- Harry Potter and the Philosopher's Stone - (2000) Voice of the Mountain Troll
- The Hitchhiker's Guide to the Galaxy (2005) - Vogon Performer
- Muppets Most Wanted (2014) - UK Muppet Performer and Coordinator
- Come Away (2020) - White Rabbit

=== Television ===
- Churchill's People (1975) - Soldier
- Warship (1976) - Steward
- Pipkins (1976–1978) - Hartley Hare, Tortoise, Mooney the Badger, Uncle Hare, Angus McHare and Narrator
- Owner Occupied (1977) - Corporal Klein
- The Sunday Drama - The Man Who Liked Elephants (1977) - Jingo
- Doctor Who (1978) - Unstoffe
- Golden Soak (1979) - Customs officer
- Young at Heart (1981) - Kenneth
- Angels (1982) - Martin Fisher
- The Cleopatras (1983) - Lycon
- Spitting Image (1984 - 1996) - Puppeteer
- The Pickwick Papers (1985) - Man at pound
- The Tale of the Bunny Picnic (1986) - Additional Muppet Performer
- Treehouse (1987–1988) - Mr. Tree
- Hot Dog (1988) - Big Dog
- Spooks of Bottle Bay (1992) - Sid Sludge, Teacher & others
- The Secret Life of Toys (1994) - Mew
- Roger and the Rottentrolls (1996-2000) - Aysgarth (puppetry)
- Potamus Park (1997) - Herbie, Mo, Mindy
- Round the Bend (1988 - 1991) Vince Vermin
- Alice in Wonderland (1999) - The Dormouse (voice)
- Mopatop's Shop (1999 - 2001) - Moosey Mouse, Bradley, Lamont and about 200 guests
- Combat Sheep (2001) - Moose
- Ripley and Scuff (2002) - Ripley, Bargie
- The Dan and Dusty Show (2004) - Dan
- Thomas & Friends (2004–2011) - Awdry's Letter Narrator (voice)
- 21st Century Pipkins (2005) - Hartley Hare
- New Captain Scarlet (2005) - Captain Black, Doctor Gold, Stormtrooper (voices)
- Five Minutes More (2006) - Faraway
- An Audience with Joe Pasquale - (2005) Gonzo's cousin Kevin
- Bunnytown - (2007) - Lil Bad Bunny, King Bunny & Others
- That Puppet Game Show (2013–2014) - Udders McGee, Hot Dog, Fenton & Announcer
- Comic Relief: Monkey's Monumental Mission (2015) - Monkey
- Monty & Co. (2020) - Monty, Snail, Charlie & Narrator & Producer

=== Video games ===
The Muppet CDROM: Muppets Inside (1996) - Additional voices

Theatre

- Conduct Unbecoming - Bill Kenwrifght Tour (1971) Simon Bolton
- Doctor Dolittle - The Musical (1998) Puppet Coordinator and Director - West End and Tour
- Avenue Q - West end and Tours (2005 - ) Puppet Coach
- Cupid and Psyche - The Little Angel Theatre (2001) Director
- Louise Gold... by appointment (2002) Director
- The Secret Garden - Little Angel Theatre - (2003) - Director
- Demon Days Live - Manchester Opera House - (2005) - Murdoc Niccals
- Little Shop of Horrors - Menier Chocolate Factory - (2006) Plant Consultant
- Peppa Pig's Party Live - West End and Tours - (2009) Puppet Coach
- Peppa Pig's Treasure Hunt Live - West End and Tours - (2011) Director
- Anglo the Musical - Kite Productions Dublin - Puppet Coach
- Avenue Q in Concert at The Sondheim, London (2024) - Sisco Entertainment. - Puppet Coach
