= Five Minutes More (TV series) =

- Genre: Children's
- Created by: Donna Andrews; Justine Flynn
- Written by: Jan Page; Mellie Buse
- Directed by: Mark Barnard
- Voices of: Nigel Plaskitt; Gillie Robic; Elizabeth Lindsay; Mark Jefferis; Louise Gold
- Countries of origin: Australia; United Kingdom
- Original language: English
- No. of seasons: 1
- No. of episodes: 64

Production
- Executive producers: Angus Fletcher; Martin Robertson
- Producers: Donna Andrews; Justine Flynn
- Running time: 5 minutes
- Production companies: Snow River Media; Buster Dandy Productions

Original release
- Network: ABC2 (Australia); Playhouse Disney (United Kingdom)
- Release: 23 August – 21 November 2006

Five Minutes More is a children's television series co-produced between Australia and the United Kingdom. It was produced by Snow River Media and Buster Dandy Productions, and developed by The Jim Henson Company. The series premiered on ABC on 23 August 2006. It was broadcast in Spanish on V-me in the United States.

== Synopsis ==
The show starts off with one of the five animals telling a story: Faraway, an aardvark; Georgie, a penguin; Florrie, a dog; Sam, a monkey; and Louisa, a polar bear. Each story has a moral to it.

== Production ==
The programme was announced on 8 December 2005 during ABC Enterprises' Children's Television Special Project, when Australian broadcaster The Australian Broadcasting Corporation and Disney Channels Worldwide commissioned an Australian/British puppet television series entitled Five Minutes More for ABC's channel ABC2 (now ABC Family) and Disney's Playhouse Disney channels in Europe, the series would be created by Bambaloo creators Donna Andrews and Justine Flynn while their Australian television production outfit Buster Dandy Productions (which would eventually merge with Sticky Pictures an animation studio that Buster Dandy Productions' founder Donna Andrews co-founded with Stu Connolly four years later on 27 January 2010) would produce with the duo would also serve as producers for the upcoming television series Five Minutes More alongside British production company Snow River Media with its founder & former Jim Henson Television executive Angus Fletcher would serve as executive producer while ABC's distribution arm ABC Enterprises would handle worldwide distribution to the upcoming series.

The puppet characters for the series was originally intended to be made at The Jim Henson Company's creature shop based in London, England the series was originally set to be produced by The Jim Henson Company, but however, The Jim Henson Company shuttered its UK production operations in 2004 a year before the series was made and closed its London-based Creature Shop a year layer in July 2005 due to tax incentives in the UK production market five months before the series was announced, therefore London-based puppet production studio Solution Studios (now Puppet Magic Studio), a studio founded by Daniel Byrne assumed the role of producing, designing & building the puppet characters for the upcoming series with Paul Jomain (who previously made puppets for Bambaloo and Jim Henson's other productions Mopatop's Shop and The Hoobs) would make costumes for them All sets are cardboard and costumes are made with quilt fabric the same type on the bed they sit on telling these stories. The quilt is specially made with square pictures mostly based on a stories that is about to or has been already told. The series was shot in eight weeks in Australia, and dubbed in Britain.

== Episodes ==
No.	Title	Original release date
1	"The Three Musicians"	23 August 2006
2	"Snowy Story"	2006
3	"Neptune's Visit"	2006
4	"Make Me a Rainbow"	2006
5	"Frown Town"	2006
6	"The Three Elephants"	2006
7	"Messy Mountain"	2006
8	"Jealous Jack"	2006
9	"One, Two, Three Jump"	2006
10	"Bingle-Bongle-Boo"	2006
11	"The Surprise Laugh"	2006
12	"My Own Special Picture"	2006
13	"I Can't Go to Sleep"	2006
14	"Someone to Sing to Me"	2006
15	"Cooking Up a Storm"	2006
16	"I Want a Frizzle"	2006
17	"The Queen's Dance"	2006
18	"The Last Orange"	2006
19	"Magic My Way"	2006
20	"Land Ahoy!"	2006
21	"Copy Parrot"	2006
22	"Monkeys Don't Eat Soup"	2006
23	"Let Me Tell You a Story"	2006
24	"There's a Dragon in My Bed"	2006
25	"The Greedy Elf"	2006
26	"The Big Gold Cup"	2006
27	"The Best Birthday Party Ever"	2006
28	"All Together Now!"	2006
29	"The Giant Who Had No Manners"	2006
30	"Sebastian's Spring Fair"	2006
31	"At Least It Isn't Elephants"	2006
32	"The Princess Who Couldn't Choose"	2006
33	"What Noise Am I Making?"	2006
34	"Umbrellas Up! Umbrellas Down!"	2006
35	"The Friendly Caterpillar"	2006
36	"Mr Hammer and Mr Spanner"	2006
37	"Pulling Together"	2006
38	"The Lost Voice"	2006
39	"Uncle Miscellania"	2006
40	"The Mayor's Parade"	2006
41	"It's All in the Mix"	2006
42	"I Want to Be Bigger"	2006
43	"Clubbing Together"	2006
44	"Saved by the Wool"	2006
45	"For the Love of Trees"	2006
46	"Who Wants a Hat?"	2006
47	"The Very Best Present"	2006
48	"Sometimes it's Good to Be Slow"	2006
49	"Watch It Grow"	2006
50	"Playing by the Rules"	2006
51	"The Two Brave Knights"	2006
52	"The Sun Will Always Shine"	2006
53	"Lighthouse Land"	2006
54	"Follow Me! Follow Me!"	2006
55	"Three Wishes for Faraway"	2006
56	"The Magic Bear"	2006
57	"Blow, Faraway, Blow!"	2006
58	"The Magic of Music"	2006
59	"The Fairacre Friends"	2006
60	"Little Gnome Upon the Wall"	2006
61	"How Does Your Garden Grow?"	2006
62	"Plump Plum Pies!"	2006
63	"Dog in a Box"	2006
64	"Little Tree"	21 November 2006

== Home release ==
- Five Minutes More – The Very Best Present
- Five Minutes More – The Best Birthday Party Ever
- Five Minutes More – Bingle Bongle Boo
- Five Minutes More – Make Me A Rainbow
- Five Minutes More – All Together Now
- Five Minutes More – Magic of Music
- Five Minutes More – Volume One
- Five Minutes More – Bumper Pack Two Disc Collection
