= Alice in Wonderland (1999 film) =

Television film by Nick Willing

- Based on: Alice's Adventures in Wonderland and Through the Looking-Glass by Lewis Carroll
- Screenplay by: Peter Barnes
- Directed by: Nick Willing
- Starring: Robbie Coltrane; Whoopi Goldberg; Ben Kingsley; Christopher Lloyd; Miranda Richardson; Martin Short; Peter Ustinov; George Wendt; Gene Wilder; Tina Majorino
- Composer: Richard Hartley
- Countries of origin: United Kingdom; United States; Germany
- Original language: English

Production
- Executive producers: Robert Halmi, Sr. Robert Halmi, Jr.
- Producer: Dyson Lovell
- Cinematography: Stefan Lange; Giles Nuttgens
- Editor: Alex Mackie
- Running time: 129 minutes
- Production companies: Hallmark Entertainment; Babelsberg International Film Produktion
- Budget: $21 million

Original release
- Network: NBC
- Release: February 28, 1999

Alice in Wonderland is a 1999 made-for-television film adaptation of Lewis Carroll's books Alice's Adventures in Wonderland (1865) and Through the Looking-Glass (1871). It was first broadcast on NBC on February 28, 1999 and then shown on British television on Channel 4.

Tina Majorino played the lead role of Alice and a number of well-known performers portrayed the eccentric characters whom Alice meets during the course of the story, including Ben Kingsley, Martin Short, Whoopi Goldberg, Peter Ustinov, Christopher Lloyd, Gene Wilder, George Wendt, Robbie Coltrane and Miranda Richardson. In common with most adaptations of the book, it includes scenes and characters from Through the Looking-Glass.

The film won four Emmy Awards in the categories of costume design, makeup, music and visual effects.

The film was re-released as a special edition DVD on March 2, 2010. No special features were included; however, the film was restored to its original speed as prior releases suffered from PAL speed-up. A rare behind-the-scenes documentary of the film was released to YouTube in 2019, the 20th anniversary of the film's release.

== Plot ==
Alice unwillingly prepares a performance of the song "Cherry Ripe" for her parents' garden party; facing stage fright of performing a song she dislikes to an audience of strangers, she hides in the woods. There, she sees the White Rabbit and follows him to a rabbit hole, which leads her to Wonderland. Alice attempts to enter a small door leading to a beautiful garden, but accidentally grows to giant size and floods the room with tears before shrinking to the size of a mouse. She meets Mr. Mouse, whose avian friends attend his boring history lecture and participate in a Caucus Race, which Alice is asked to give out prizes for.

Alice again encounters the White Rabbit, who tells her to retrieve his gloves from his house; there, Alice drinks from a bottle which makes her grow, trapping her inside. The White Rabbit and his gardeners Pat and Bill attempt to remove Alice, but she shrinks to a tiny size. Wandering in long grass, she meets Major Caterpillar, who tells her not to be afraid when performing before transforming into a swarm of butterflies. Alice returns to normal size by eating part of his mushroom and arrives at the manor house of the Duchess, whose Cheshire Cat advises Alice to visit the Mad Hatter and his friend the March Hare.

Alice meets the Hatter and Hare with their friend the Dormouse at a tea party, where she is given advice on the fun of performing and how to get around stage fright. The Mad Hatter performs for her as he had previously at a concert of the wicked Queen of Hearts. Alice leaves when the two start to stuff the Dormouse into a teapot and once again finds the small door, this time entering the garden, which turns out to be a labyrinth maze belonging to the Queen of Hearts, who is quick to have people beheaded. The Queen invites Alice to her bizarre game of croquet, where the Cheshire Cat's face appears and is ordered to be beheaded, but Alice's logic stays the order and everyone applauds her.

Alice escapes the croquet game and meets the Gryphon and Mock Turtle, who teach her the Lobster Quadrille dance. Alice then wanders into the illustration in an enormous book, emerging in a wooded area where the Red Knight is battling the White Knight, who encourages her to be brave when she goes home. Alice encounters talking flowers and bickering twins Tweedledum and Tweedledee, who tell her the story of The Walrus and the Carpenter, before card soldiers bring her to the royal court, where the Knave of Hearts is put on trial for apparently stealing the Queen's tarts.

Upon seeing the tarts have been untouched and the trial is pointless, Alice openly criticizes the Queen and King Cedric. She is called to the stand to defend herself, where the White Rabbit asks her if she has confidence in herself; when she answers that she does he states "then you don't need us anymore", and Alice awakens back home. Instead of singing "Cherry Ripe", Alice courageously sings the Lobster Quadrille in front of her parents and their guests (who all resemble the Wonderland characters), who, to Alice's delight, all enjoy her performance.

== Cast ==
- Tina Majorino as Alice – A British young girl who is nervous and unenthusiastic about performing the song Cherry Ripe at her parents' party in the beginning. After her adventures in Wonderland, she finds the confidence to sing.
- Miranda Richardson as Queen of Hearts – A childish queen whose only way of dealing with rage is to shout "Off with their heads!" She sometimes calls in a very high pitch as a persuasive tactic. At the Knave's trial, she hosts a croquet game involving hedgehog balls and flamingo mallets. The trial turned out to be held under unfounded pretenses.
- Martin Short as the Mad Hatter – A mad haberdasher whose tea party Alice happens upon. Other party guests are the March Hare and the Dormouse. The Hatter and the March Hare are quite rude to Alice, insulting her several times and shooing her away. Nevertheless, the Mad Hatter performs a bizarre parody of "Twinkle Twinkle Little Star" for Alice. He informs Alice that he once sang the same piece during the Queen's concert but was sent away because she was offended by his performance. The Mad Hatter was also called as a witness to the Knave's trial, where he reprised his performance, further angering the queen and causing her to chase him away as she shouted "off with his head!" Presumably, he and the March Hare escaped decapitation again due to their speed.
- Whoopi Goldberg as the Cheshire Cat – A grinning cat who teaches Alice "the rules" of Wonderland. She was also one of the few characters who was nice to Alice. Her favorite pastime is appearing and disappearing.
- Simon Russell Beale as The King of Hearts – The foolish husband of the Queen who constantly tries to be like his wife and fawns over her.
- Ken Dodd as Mr. Mouse – A very kind, funny and wise mouse who tries to get Alice dry with a very boring lecture. When it fails, the Dodo suggests that they have a caucus race. Mr. Mouse is last seen going home, along with his friends, for a cup of hot chocolate.
- Gene Wilder as The Mock Turtle – A weird type of turtle who often cries on remembering his moments at his school in the sea. He sings two songs to Alice: The Lobster Quadrille and Beautiful Soup. His best friend is the Gryphon.
- Francis Wright as the voice of the March Hare – The Mad Hatter's mad tea party companion. His costume scared Tina Majorino because of the asymmetrical eyes. His puppetry was performed by Adrian Getley, Robert Tygner and Francis Wright.
- George Wendt and Robbie Coltrane as Tweedledee and Tweedledum, respectively – Two fat brothers who tell Alice the story of The Walrus and the Carpenter. After this, Ned Tweedledum finds his new rattle spoiled, which he thinks was spoiled by Fred Tweedledee. They have a brief battle which is interrupted by a monstrous crow which scares them away.
- Richard Coombs as the voice of the White Rabbit – A human-sized rabbit who is always running late. He serves as herald to the Queen and King. Alice also got stuck in his house in the film. He was performed by Kiran Shah and Richard Coombs.
- Christopher Lloyd as The White Knight – A kind knight who invented a lunchbox which he carries upside down so the sandwiches in it do not get wet. Alice points out that since it is upside down, and the lid is not closed, the sandwiches will fall out. He replies with, "So that's what happened to my sandwiches." He is also not very good at riding his horse.
- Elizabeth Spriggs as The Duchess – A duchess who is first seen nursing a baby which turns into a pig. Her pet is the Cheshire Cat. She was occasionally kind to Alice.
- Ben Kingsley as Major Caterpillar – A rude caterpillar major who is first seen smoking a hookah. He gives Alice advice on how to be brave on singing.
- Peter Ustinov and Pete Postlethwaite as The Walrus and the Carpenter, respectively – Two characters in the Tweedles' story.
- Donald Sinden as the voice of the Gryphon – A creature (with a look of both lion and eagle) who is the Mock Turtle's best friend. He shows Alice to him and used to go to school in the sea with the Mock Turtle. The Gryphon was operated by puppeteers David Alan Barclay, Adrian Getley, Adrian Parish, Mark Hunter and Robert Tygner.
- Jason Flemyng as The Knave of Hearts – The King and Queen's nephew and a clueless knave who is accused of stealing the Queen's tarts. The Queen constantly refers to him as an idiot.
- Jason Byrne and Paddy Joyce as Pat and Bill the Lizard, respectively – The White Rabbit's two loyal Irish gardeners. Pat is very reluctant to do his job while Bill is a little more trustworthy.
- Liz Smith, Ken Campbell, Heathcote Williams and Peter Bayliss as Miss Lory, Mr Duck, Mr Eaglet and Mr Dodo, respectively. – The Mouse's group of friends who are in the caucus race.
- Joanna Lumley as Tiger Lily – A very talkative flower who gives Alice directions.
- Sheila Hancock as The Cook – The Duchess's crazy cook who enjoys putting pepper in her meals. She also likes throwing dishes at Alice and the Duchess.
- Murray Melvin as Executioner – The Queen's chief executioner who argues that it would be impossible to behead the Cheshire Cat because the animal doesn't have a body.
- Nigel Plaskitt as the voice of the Dormouse – The Mad Hatter and March Hare's tea party companion who is asleep through most of the tea party scene. He seems to have a fondness for treacle and was later stuffed into a teapot by his companions. His puppeteers were Nigel Plaskitt and David Alan Barclay.
  - Nigel Plaskitt also voices the Pig Baby, a rather ugly baby who is first seen being nursed by the Duchess. He soon turns into a pig. Puppeteered by Adrian Parish.
- Peter Eyre and Hugh Lloyd as the Frog and Fish Footmen – Two footmen who were first seen standing in front of the Duchess's house. The Fishface handed the Frogface an invitation for the Duchess to play croquet, then walked away. The Frogface was also rather stupid.
- Matthew Sim, Jonathan Broadbent and Christopher Ryan as the Rose Painting Cards – The three cards were first seen painting white roses red because they accidentally planted them white and if the Queen found out she would behead them. The Queen soon found out and Alice saved them by hiding them in her pocket.
- Gerard Naprous as the Red Knight – A knight who challenges the White Knight to a fight. In the end, they decided not to fight anymore. The Red Knight then leaves on his horse.
- Janine Eser as Alice's mother
- Jeremy Brudenell as Alice's father
- Mary Healey as Nanny
- Dilys Laye as Governess
- John Owens as Red Bishop
- Christopher Greet as White Castle

== Special effects ==
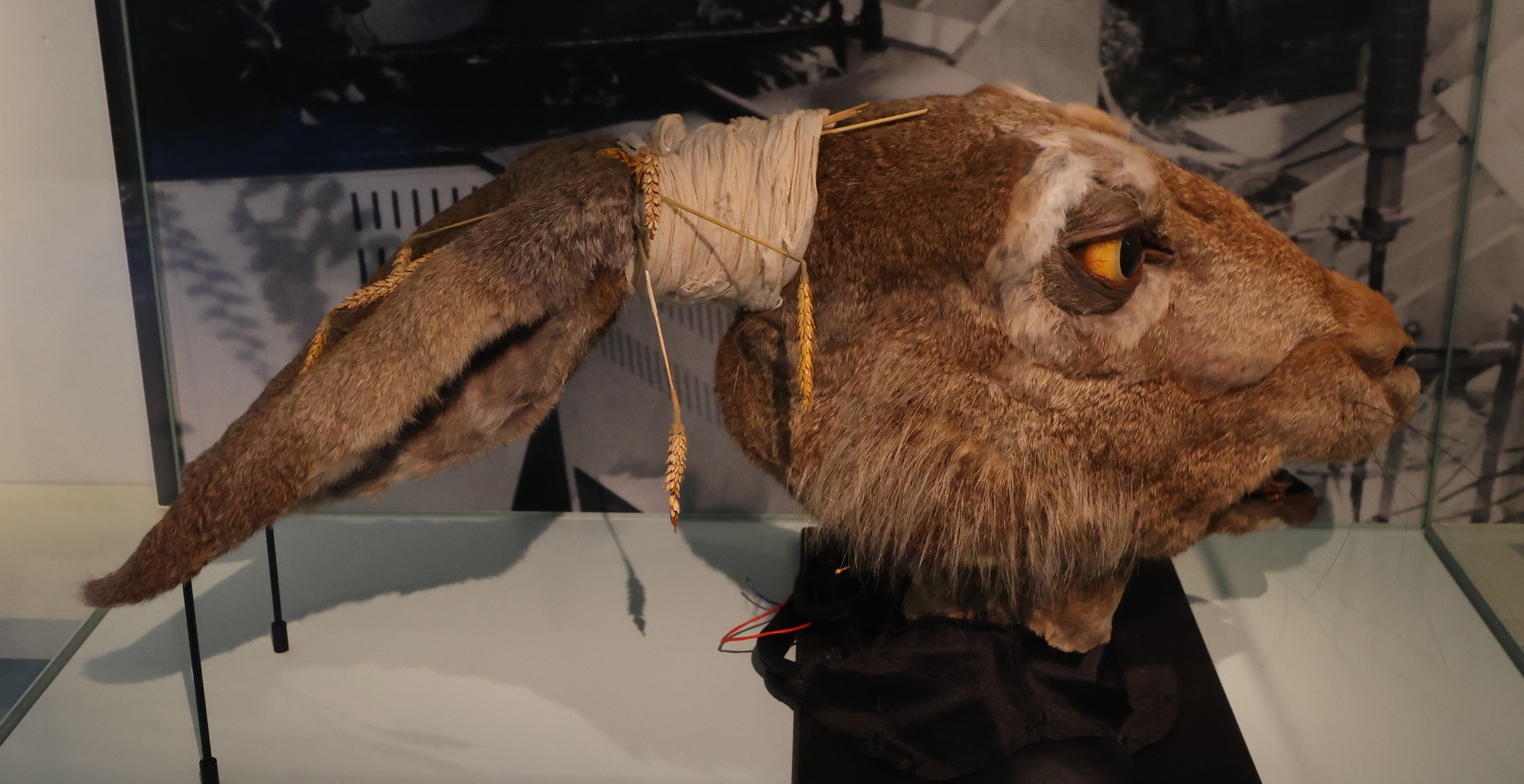
March hare head produced by Jim Henson's Creature Shop

The film utilized both puppetry and live-action footage. The puppet designs were created by Jim Henson's Creature Shop.

In all, 875 special digital effects were created for the film. An example is Martin Short's head; it was enlarged to three times its size to resemble the Hatter in Tenniel's illustrations.

In December 2018, composer Richard Hartley was interviewed for Tammy Tuckey's "Rattling the Stars" podcast about his work on the film for the 20th anniversary, providing never-before-heard stories.

In September 2019, director Nick Willing was also interviewed for Tammy Tuckey's Rattling the Stars" podcast about his work directing the film for the 20th anniversary.

In 2019, a behind the scenes documentary of the film was released on YouTube, which had originally been broadcast on the Hallmark Channel (then known as Odyssey Network) in 1999 and had not been included on any VHS, DVD, or digital releases of the film.

In March 2024, castmembers Kiran Shah, Richard Strange, Nigel Plaskitt, Matthew Sim and Francis Wright as well as production designer Roger Hall, reunited to celebrate the film's 25-year anniversary by participating in a 1-hour livestream on YouTube on The Tammy Tuckey Show. The event had been organised ahead of time.

== Reception ==
The original NBC airing averaged a 14.8 household rating and a 22 percent audience share and was watched by 25.34 million viewers, ranking as the 6th highest rated program that week in terms of households and the most watched program that week in terms of total viewers.

=== Critical response ===
On review aggregator website Rotten Tomatoes, the film has an approval rating of 33% based on six critical reviews.

David Zurawik gave the film a positive review in The Baltimore Sun, calling it a "grand and magical production" and praising the cast's performances, particularly Majorino and Wilder. Rating the film 2 out of 5 stars, David Parkinson of Radio Times praised the "wondrous Jim Henson puppetry" and the performances of Richardson and Wilder; however, he found the film "still falls short of the cherished images taken from those first readings of Lewis Carroll's classic tales."

== Awards ==
Year	Award	Category	Recipients	Result
1999	Primetime Emmy Awards	Outstanding Costume Design for a Miniseries or a Movie	Charles Knode	Won
1999	Primetime Emmy Awards	Outstanding Makeup for a Miniseries, Movie or a Special	Anne Spiers, James Kell, Duncan Jarman and Sandra Shepherd	Won
1999	Primetime Emmy Awards	Outstanding Special Visual Effects for a Miniseries or a Movie	David Booth, Richard Conway, Bob Hollow, Andy Lomas, Alex Parkinson, Martin Parsons, Jamie Courtier, Avtar Bains, William Bartlett, Nick Bennett, Oliver Bersey, Murray Butler, George Roper, Pedro Sabrosa, Angus Wilson and Ben Cronin	Won
1999	Primetime Emmy Awards	Outstanding Music Composition for a Miniseries or a Movie (Dramatic Underscore)	Richard Hartley	Won
1999	Primetime Emmy Awards	Outstanding Art Direction for a Miniseries or Movie	Karen Brookes, Roger Hall, Rosalind Shingleton, Alan Tomkins	Nominated
1999	Primetime Emmy Awards	Outstanding Main Title Design	Chris Allies	Nominated
1999	Artios Award	Movie of the Week Casting	Lynn Kressel	Nominated
1999	Golden Reel Award	Best Sound Editing – Television Movies of the Week – Music	Andrew Glen	Nominated
2000	RTS Craft & Design Awards	Visual Effects	Framestore	Won
1999	Television Critics Association Awards	Outstanding Achievement in Movies, Miniseries and Specials	Alice in Wonderland	Nominated
1999	YoungStar Award	Best Young Actress in a Mini-Series/Made for TV Film	Tina Majorino	Nominated
1999	OFTA Television Award	Best Motion Picture Made for Television	Alice in Wonderland	Nominated
1999	OFTA Television Award	Best Ensemble in a Motion Picture or Miniseries	Alice in Wonderland	Nominated
1999	OFTA Television Award	Best Costume Design in a Motion Picture or Miniseries	Alice in Wonderland	Nominated
1999	OFTA Television Award	Best New Titles Sequence in a Motion Picture or Miniseries	Alice in Wonderland	Won
1999	OFTA Television Award	Best Production Design in a Motion Picture or Miniseries	Alice in Wonderland	Won
1999	OFTA Television Award	Best Sound in a Motion Picture or Miniseries	Alice in Wonderland	Nominated
1999	OFTA Television Award	Best Visual Effects in a Motion Picture or Miniseries	Alice in Wonderland	Won
1999	OFTA Television Award	Best Makeup/Hairstyling in a Motion Picture or Miniseries	Alice in Wonderland	Won
1999	OFTA Television Award	Best Lighting in a Motion Picture or Miniseries	Alice in Wonderland	Nominated
1999	OFTA Television Award	Best Music in a Motion Picture or Miniseries	Richard Hartley	Won
1999	OFTA Television Award	Best New Theme Song in a Motion Picture or Miniseries	Richard Hartley	Won
1999	OFTA Television Award	Best Supporting Actor in a Motion Picture or Miniseries	Gene Wilder	Nominated
1999	OFTA Television Award	Best Supporting Actor in a Motion Picture or Miniseries	Martin Short	Nominated
1999	OFTA Television Award	Best Supporting Actress in a Motion Picture or Miniseries	Miranda Richardson	Nominated
