= Pat (Alice's Adventures in Wonderland) =

- Alice character
- Pat is believed by some to be the ape that appears in the Caucus Race
- First appearance: Alice's Adventures in Wonderland
- Created by: Lewis Carroll
- Portrayed by: Scott Baio, Freddie Earlle, Jason Byrne, Bill Thompson, Jon Glover

In-universe information
- Species: Guinea pig? Ape?
- Gender: Male
- Occupation: Gardener
- Nationality: Irish

Pat is a fictional character in Lewis Carroll's 1865 book Alice's Adventures in Wonderland. He appears in the chapter "The Rabbit Sends in a Little Bill." He works for the White Rabbit like his friend Bill the Lizard. Carroll never gives any description of the character other than being a gardener, and his species has been widely debated, with evidence showing he is likely to be a monkey or a guinea pig.

When the White Rabbit mistakes Alice for his maid, Mary Ann, she drinks from a bottle that makes her grow. The Rabbit thinks she is a monster, so he asks Pat to climb down the chimney to get the monster out of his house. Pat refuses, so the Rabbit decides to send Bill the Lizard to climb down instead. When Bill climbs down the chimney, Alice kicks him, causing him to fly out of the chimney and back into the Rabbit's garden.

== Appearance ==
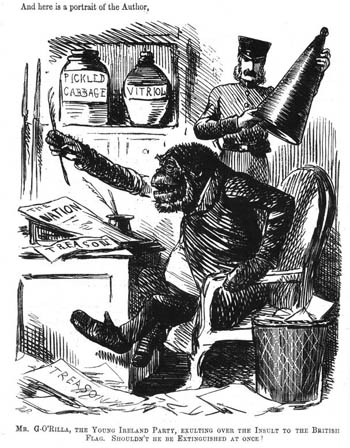
An Irishman depicted as a monkey

Pat's appearance has been of much debate as Carroll never gives any description of the character, so it is unknown whether he is supposed to be an animal, human, or bird. However, there are several theories as to what species he is.

Pat is strongly hinted to be Irish, judging by the way he speaks. He says several phrases that could be considered Irish, such as, "Sure then I'm here! Digging for apples, yer honour", "Sure, it's an arm, yer honour!' (He pronounces it arrum.)". Carroll continues to hint at his Irish roots by claiming he is "digging for apples". In Victorian times Irish apples was a slang word for potatoes. Pat is also commonly an Irish name, short for Patrick.

According to The Annotated Alice, Pat is likely to be one of the two guinea pigs that help to revive Bill after he comes shooting out of the chimney. If this is true, then Pat also makes a second appearance, as the two same guinea pigs are said to be jurors in the Queen's court that are suppressed for cheering.

A second theory, suggested by David Lockwood, is that Pat is the ape that appears in the Caucus Race and the Pool of Tears. This is because Pat is strongly hinted to be Irish, and in Victorian satirical cartoons Irishmen were almost always depicted as having the appearance of apes. Furthermore, in several Punch cartoons of Irish workers, they were not only depicted as having an ape-like appearance but were frequently given the name Pat or Paddy. However the ape is not mentioned in the text and only appears in Tenniel's illustrations, so it is possible that this is only a product of Tenniel's imagination and not Carroll's.

In the Marvel Classics Comics adaptation published in 1978, the White Rabbit's comment ("An arm, you goose!") is taken literally and Pat is depicted as a goose.

Other theories suggest that Pat is simply a lizard, like his co-worker Bill. Many Disney fans confuse Pat with the Dodo, as the characters are merged in the film, though there is no evidence to support the idea that they are the same character in the book.

== In Disney's animated film ==
In the Disney animated film, Pat's character is merged with that of The Dodo, who appears earlier in the film as part of the Caucus Race. This leads to the character sometimes being referred to as Pat the Dodo, though this name is never mentioned in the film. Dodo is an authoritative sailor rather than the gardener that Pat is. He is voiced by Bill Thompson.

The Dodo is first seen as Alice is floating on the sea in a bottle. The Dodo is seen singing, but when Alice asks him for help, he does not notice her. On shore, the Dodo is seen on a rock, organizing a caucus race. This race involves running around until one gets dry, but the attempts are hampered by incoming waves.

The Dodo is later summoned by the White Rabbit, when the rabbit believes that a monster (actually a giant-sized Alice) is inside his home. The Dodo brings Bill the Lizard, and attempts to get him to go down the chimney. Bill refuses at first, but the Dodo is able to convince him otherwise. However, the soot causes Alice to sneeze, sending Bill high up into the sky. The Dodo then decides to burn the house down, much to the chagrin of the White Rabbit. He begins gathering wood, such as the furniture, for this purpose. However, Alice soon returns to a smaller size and exits the house.

The White Rabbit soon leaves, while the Dodo asks for matches, not realizing that the situation has been resolved. He then asks Alice for a match, but when she doesn't have any, Dodo complains about the lack of cooperation and uses his pipe to light the fire.

The Dodo later appears briefly at the end of the film, conducting another Caucus Race.

== Other adaptations ==
He appears in the 1985 film as a guinea pig

- 1985 television movie played by Scott Baio
- 1985 television series played by Jon Glover
- 1972 film played by Freddie Earlle
- 1999 film played by Jason Byrne
