= Found Studio Tracks =

Compilation album by Steely Dan
- Released: 2007
- Genre: Jazz rock

Found Studio Tracks is a compilation of session recordings made by Donald Fagen and Walter Becker prior to their formation of the band Steely Dan. Most were never released on a studio album, but six of them were later rerecorded for albums. Most of the recordings are of very low quality and are simply demos.

The collection, or parts of it, was also released under numerous album names, such as Donald Fagan and Walter Becker of Steely Dan, and Walter Becker / Donald Fagen - The Early Years. The most complete collections are Android Warehouse, and Catalyst: The Original Recordings 1968-71 for a total of 28 or 29 songs (the latter adding an alternate version of one of them).

== Track listing ==
1. "Brain Tap Shuffle" - 3:12
2. "Come Back Baby" - 4:14
3. "I Can't Function" - 4:08
4. "Let George Do It" - 3:11
5. "Old Regime" - 3:16
6. "Brooklyn (Owes the Charmer Under Me)" - 6:13*
7. "Any World (That I'm Welcome To)" - 3:50*
8. "Caves of Altamira" - 3:26*
9. "The Mock Turtle Song" - 3:44 (Lewis Carroll)
10. "Mina from China" (alt. title "Yellow Peril") - 4:04
11. "You Go Where I Go" - 2:15
12. "This Seat's Been Taken" - 2:52
13. "Barry Town" - 2:15*
14. "More to Come" - 0:49
15. "A Little with Sugar" - 0:49
16. "Take It Out on Me" - 2:15
17. "Android Warehouse" - 1:20
18. "The Roaring of the Lamb" - 2:30
19. "Charlie Freak" - 1:10*
20. "Sun Mountain/A Horse in Town" - 3:47
21. "Stone Piano" - 1:48
22. "Parker's Band" - 1:26*
23. Oh Wow, It's You Again

*(Rerecorded for subsequent studio albums)

Four more songs that circulate on the various collections:

- "Ida Lee"
- "Undecided"
- "Soul Ram"
- "Don't Let Me In"

("A Horse In Town" is its own track in other collections, and there is an alternate version of "Sun Mountain" on one of them)
