= Natalie Gregory =

American former child actress

- Occupation: Actress
- Years active: 1983–1990

Natalie Gregory is an American former child actress.

== Early years ==
Gregory is the daughter of Cliff and Linda Gregory. She has an older sister, Sharee.

== Career ==
She starred as Alice in the 1985 television film Alice in Wonderland.

Gregory has had guest-starring roles in a number of television series, including a two-part episode of Highway to Heaven. She provided the voice of Jenny Foxworth for the 1988 Disney animated film Oliver & Company.

Gregory retired from acting in 1990. She now works as Vice President of Carahsoft Technology Group.

== Filmography ==
Year	Film	Role	Notes
1983	Two Marriages		TV episode - "Relativity". (OAD: 08/24/1983)
1983	Matt Houston	Jody Harrison	TV episode - "The Ghost of Carter Gault". (OAD: 10/28/1983)
1984	Trapper John, M.D.		TV episode - "Send in the Clowns". (OAD: 02/12/1984)
1984	Cagney & Lacey	Carrie Mitchell	TV episode - "Child Witness". (OAD: 10/15/1984)
1984	Magnum, P.I.	Elizabeth Bowman	TV episode - "Blind Justice". (OAD: 11/08/1984)
1985	Robert Kennedy and His Times	Courtney Kennedy	TV miniseries; appeared in parts 1 & 2 of 3-part miniseries, originally aired on CBS. Natalie played as the child version, while Betsy Baker played as the adult version in part 3. (OAD for parts 1 & 2: 01/27/1985 and 01/28/1985 respectively)
1985	Highway to Heaven	Amy	TV episode - "A Child of God". (OAD: 02/06/1985)
1985	Kids Don't Tell	Krista Mueller	TV movie, originally aired on CBS. (OAD: 03/05/1985)
1985	Alice in Wonderland	Alice	TV miniseries, aired as a two-night event on CBS from December 9–10. Part 1 was Alice's Adventures in Wonderland, while part 2 was Alice Through the Looking Glass. A slightly re-edited version, with both parts treated as two completely separate stories, was released by Warner Home Video in 1993.
1986	Amazing Stories	Dorothy	TV episode - "Dorothy and Ben". (OAD: 03/02/1986)
1986	Fathers and Sons	Rebecca	TV episode - "We'll Always Have the Mall". (OAD: 04/13/1986)
1986	Spot Marks the X	Kathy	TV movie, Disney Channel original. Originally aired on October 18, 1986. Later aired on ABC on May 17, 1987, in a 2-hour format as part of The Disney Sunday Movie. Also aired in a 2-part format on that show, with part 1 airing on July 3, 1988, and part 2 airing the following Sunday.
1986	Fresno	China Kensington	TV miniseries; 5-part miniseries, originally aired on CBS.
1986	Mr. Belvedere	Cindy Douglas	TV episode - "The Spelling Bee". (OAD: 12/05/1986)
1987	The Wizard	Katie and Caroline (dual role)	TV episode - "Gypsies, Tramps and Thieves" . (OAD: 02/03/1987)
1987	The New Mike Hammer	Jennifer Decker	TV episode - "A Blinding Fear". (OAD: 04/29/1987)
1988	Stranger on My Land	Gillian	TV movie, originally aired on ABC. (OAD: 01/17/1988)
1988	Highway to Heaven	Jennifer Bradley	TV episodes - "A Dolphin Song for Lee": Parts 1 & 2. (OAD for parts 1 & 2: 03/16/1988 and 03/23/1988 respectively)
1988	Oliver & Company	Jenny Foxworth	The 27th full-length animated film from The Walt Disney Company. Originally released in theaters on November 18, 1988, and again on March 29, 1996. Was not released on home video in the United States until 1996.
1989	Cranium Command	Annie	Former Epcot Center attraction at Walt Disney's World Resort theme park. Opened on October 19, 1989. Attraction closed on January 1, 2007.
1989	Wait Until Spring, Bandini	Rose	Belgian/French/Italian/American production, released in Europe on December 6, 1989, and in the U.S. on June 29, 1990.
1989	The Princess and the Dwarf		Unfinished TV Movie.
1990	Beanpole	Belinda	Unsold half-hour sitcom pilot; aired on ABC as a special. (OAD: 07/04/1990)
1990	Dad's a Dog	Sarah Dryden	Unsold half-hour sitcom pilot; aired on ABC as a special. (OAD: 07/05/1990)
