= Dreamchild =

- Theatrical release poster
- Directed by: Gavin Millar
- Written by: Dennis Potter
- Produced by: Rick McCallum; Kenith Trodd
- Starring: Coral Browne; Ian Holm; Peter Gallagher; Nicola Cowper; Amelia Shankley
- Cinematography: Billy Williams
- Edited by: Angus Newton
- Music by: Stanley Myers
- Production company: Thorn EMI
- Release date: 4 October 1985
- Running time: 94 minutes
- Country: United Kingdom
- Language: English
- Budget: £4 million or $3.8 million or £2.9 million

Dreamchild is a 1985 British drama film written by Dennis Potter, directed by Gavin Millar, and produced by Rick McCallum and Kenith Trodd. The film, starring Coral Browne, Ian Holm, Peter Gallagher, Nicola Cowper and Amelia Shankley, is a fictionalised account of Alice Liddell, the child who inspired Lewis Carroll's 1865 novel Alice's Adventures in Wonderland.

The story is told from the point of view of an elderly Alice (now the widowed Mrs. Hargreaves) as she travels to the United States from England to receive an honorary degree from Columbia University celebrating the centenary of Carroll's birth. It shares common themes with Potter's television play Alice (1965). The film evolves from the factual to the hallucinatory as Alice revisits her memories of Carroll (Holm) in Victorian-era Oxford to her immediate present in Depression-era New York. Accompanied by a shy young orphan named Lucy (Cowper), Alice must make her way through the modern world of tabloid journalism and commercial exploitation while attempting to come to peace with her conflicted childhood with the Oxford don.

== Plot ==
The film begins on the ship bearing elderly widow Alice Hargreaves, who as Alice Liddell was Lewis Carroll's muse and the inspiration for his book Alice's Adventures in Wonderland, and her carer Lucy. As they disembark, they are set upon by several journalists, all trying to get a story or quote from Alice about her relationship with Carroll, whom she knew as "Mr. Dodgson". Clearly bewildered by all the excitement, she is befriended by an ex-reporter, Jack Dolan, who helps her and Lucy through the legions of the press. Dolan quickly becomes her agent and finds endorsement opportunities for her. Throughout it all, a romance develops between Jack and Lucy.

When left alone in their hotel room, Alice hallucinates that Mr. Dodgson (Ian Holm) is in their room, along with the Mad Hatter, the March Hare, the Caterpillar, the Dormouse, the Mock Turtle, and the Gryphon. When she joins them for their tea party, they make fun of her for being so old and forgetful. She remembers also the lazy boating party of 4 July 1862, when Dodgson, then a mathematics professor at her father's college, had attempted to entertain her and her sisters by spinning the nonsense tale that grew to be Alice in Wonderland.

Via flashbacks, it is insinuated that Dodgson was infatuated with Alice, and that their relationship had sexual undertones. She recalls the boating party through this new perspective; she realizes that Dodgson was jealous when she met the boy whom she would one day marry, and that she enjoyed toying with his affections, deliberately baiting him to provoke his nervous stutter. Alice tries to understand her feelings and past relationship with Dodgson in her mind.

By the time she delivers her acceptance speech at Columbia University, she has come to terms with Dodgson and the way they treated each other. In another fantasy sequence with the Mock Turtle and the Gryphon, she and Dodgson forgive each other and make peace.

== Cast ==
=== Live action ===
- Coral Browne – Alice Hargreaves
- Peter Gallagher – Jack Dolan
- Ian Holm – Reverend Charles L. Dodgson (Lewis Carroll)
- Jane Asher – Mrs. Liddell
- Nicola Cowper – Lucy
- Caris Corfman – Sally
- Amelia Shankley – Young Alice
- Shane Rimmer – Mr. Marl
- Imogen Boorman – Lorina

=== Voice cast ===
- Alan Bennett – Mock Turtle
- Ken Campbell – March Hare
- Tony Haygarth – Mad Hatter
- Fulton Mackay – Gryphon
- Frank Middlemass – Caterpillar
- Julie Walters – Dormouse

=== Puppeteers ===
- Big Mick – Mad Hatter
- Ron Mueck – Gryphon
- Karen Prell – Dormouse
- Michael Sundin – March Hare
- Steve Whitmire – Caterpillar, Mock Turtle

== Production ==
Dennis Potter had previously adapted the story for television in 1965 for the BBC's The Wednesday Play anthology series, under the title Alice. Potter expanded the story and added to his script, basing Dreamchild on a real incident where Alice went to New York to collect an honorary degree. He decided to do it as a feature, but after unhappy experiences writing Pennies from Heaven and Gorky Park he did it through his own company and also worked as executive producer. He used the producer and director of his successful TV production, Cream in My Coffee.

The film was part of a slate of movies greenlit by Verity Lambert at EMI Films. Others included Slayground, Morons from Outer Space, and Comfort and Joy. There was no US money in the film but Universal had first right of refusal to distribute.

Potter said the movie "was perilously close to an art film but I'm sick of films made for teeny tots or adults who never grew up". and "It's alleged that when you repress things you know are doubtful, that's supposed to be harmful to you as a person, but great art can come out of discipline. Dodgson was a much more complex and heroic man than we think. I'm utterly convinced he never made any questionable physical contact with Alice, but he had what in these post-Freudian days would be called a sexual longing."

=== Filming ===
Makeup and creature effects for the film were created by Jim Henson's Creature Shop. Six complexly detailed creatures, rather malformed, as they are in the book, were made. The Gryphon and the sorrowful Mock Turtle live among ledges of rock on a darkling seashore. The March Hare has broken yellowish teeth and soiled looking whiskers and he seems to be chewing even while he is speaking. He, the Mad Hatter, and the Dormouse, and the Caterpillar too, 'converse in the same matter of fact, egalitarian manner that the visiting Alice does.' The puppets were based on the original Tenniel drawings, although Potter wanted them interpreted towards the dark side. Puppet movement and choreography was developed by American actress and choreographer Gates McFadden. Due to a problem with work visas, McFadden was unable to receive full credit in this film.

The Chinese costume sequence in the film depicting Dodgson taking Alice's portrait at Oxford is based on actual photographs he took of her and her sisters. Dodgson, an early pioneer of photography, was considered one of the world's first portrait photographers.

Dennis Potter's use of pop entertainment of the 1930s in his works is present in this film. "I Only Have Eyes for You" is sung at a tea dance at the Waldorf-Astoria Hotel and Mrs. Hargreaves has a scene at a radio station that includes a crooner's rendition of "Confessin'".

The Depression-era setting of the film is in 1932, when Alice turned 80, two years before she died in 1934.

=== Post-production ===
According to director Gavin Millar, the film's producer Verity Lambert "never wanted the dean, Alice's father, to be [played by] Nigel Hawthorne," actively but unsuccessfully opposing him cast in the role. Millar later recalled, that during the editing process, "every scene with Nigel in it, she was down on it like a ton of bricks. And she gradually cut him out and out and out of every scene," so the director eventually had to edit out Hawthorne's part completely. The film's score was composed by Stanley Myers.

== Release ==
The film received a very limited release in a small number of 'art house' theatres mainly due to challenges by the film's distributors. In Britain, the film played in one London cinema for a limited engagement. Disagreements and legal challenges between the film's production company, the distributors and the cinema chains in other unrelated matters caused the film to almost disappear completely.

Browne came to London to promote the film and receive the Evening Standard's Best Actress Award for the film, appearing on the TV chat show Wogan in an attempt to publicise the film, also taking out an ad in the entertainment journal Variety offering her performance 'for your consideration' in 'Oscar Season', all at her own cost.

The film made the ten-best lists of many critics. By 1986 it sold $490,690 worth of tickets. In order to get Universal to release the film, EMI had to pay for the prints and all the advertising costs.

== Reception ==
=== Critical response ===
The film was reviewed favourably by the critic Pauline Kael who praised the performances. "Nothing I've seen Coral Browne do onscreen had prepared me for this performance. In the past she seemed too bullying a presence; she was too stiffly theatrical for the camera and her voice was a blaster. Here, as Mrs. Hargreaves, she has the capacity for wonder of the Alice of the stories, and when she's overtaken by frailty her voice is querulous and fading." "The bright, poised, subtly flirty Alice at ten [is] played by Amelia Shankley, whose conversations with her sisters have an angelic precision. The sound of these imperious little-princess voices blended in idle chitchat is plangent, evocative. It makes you happy and makes you respond to the happiness of the Reverend Mr. Dodgson as he loiters outside the little girls' windows, eavesdropping... Ian Holm, who plays Dodgson, has to achieve almost all his effects passively, by registering the man's acute and agonizing self-consciousness and his furtive reactions to what goes on around him; it's all there in Holm's performance."

Andrew Sarris's review in The Village Voice was titled "the Film That Got Away." Sarris wrote that the film "gets infinitely better as it goes along, rising inexorably towards a rich epiphany" and resisting "facile irony". He wrote, "what makes the film so rousing and inspiring is its invocation of love and art as redemptive forces pitted against the dark spirits."

Lewis Carroll scholar Edward Wakeling took a more dim view of the film. When writing in 1986 about his experience at the world premiere in Oxford, Wakeling found the film "visually stunning... well made technically, with actors of outstanding ability". He criticised two key areas of the script, subtext and narrative. The film's subtext in implying that Dodgson was in love with 10-year-old Liddell. "The "love" that is suggested in the film is tainted by impropriety. Many... scenes are totally without fact.." and the accuracy of Potter's script. "It is a pity that artistic licence is used to distort the facts beyond recognition... creating impressions that are totally unjustified."

In an article published many years later, in 2014, in the film magazine Sight & Sound, Philip Horne expanded on the relative obscurity of Dreamchild and wrote that it "remains a film worth fighting for."

Lambert said it was one of the films of which she was most proud when she ran EMI.

In 2012 producers Ron Bloom and Gene Kirkwood said they had the rights to the script and were looking at doing a new version.

=== Awards ===
Coral Browne received the Best Actress Evening Standard British Film Awards for her performance. Amelia Shankley was named Best Actress at the 1986 Paris Film Festival for her role as young Alice.
