= Mopatop's Shop =

1999 British children's TV series

- Genre: Children's television series
- Developed by: Jocelyn Stevenson
- Directed by: Simon Spencer; Tom Poole; Ian McLean
- Starring: Mak Wilson (series 1–2); William Todd-Jones (series 3–4); Victoria Willing; Nigel Plaskitt; Brian Herring; Susan Beattie; Louise Gold
- Country of origin: United Kingdom
- Original language: English
- No. of series: 4
- No. of episodes: 260

Production
- Executive producers: Brian Henson; Angus Fletcher; David Mercer
- Producers: Jocelyn Stevenson; Sue Taylor; Angus Fletcher; Pete Coogan
- Running time: 10 minutes
- Production companies: The Jim Henson Company; Carlton Television (Series 1-3)

Original release
- Network: ITV (CITV)
- Release: 4 January 1999 – 7 February 2003

Mopatop's Shop is a children's television series that premiered on CITV in the UK on 4 January 1999. 260 ten-minute episodes were made and aired daily. It was a co-production between Jim Henson Television and Carlton Television. After it finished its run on 7 February 2003, it was repeated for several years afterwards until 2010.

== Production ==
The show was produced and written by Jocelyn Stevenson, who started working with the Muppets as a lead writer on Fraggle Rock. Stevenson explained, "The aim of Mopatop's Shop is to teach young children to embrace language and communication skills in a form where they can expand the boundaries of their imagination. It promotes goodness and wellbeing."

== Plot ==
The show features Mopatop and his assistant, Puppyduck. They run Mopatop's Shop, a shop where one can buy anything they could ever think or dream of. They interact with characters including the Mouse family, local deliveryman Lamont the sloth, neighbour Claudia Bird and a rabbit named Odd-Job Gerald.

== Characters ==
=== Main characters ===
- Mopatop (performed by Mak Wilson in series 1 and 2, William Todd-Jones in series 3 and 4) – The main character of the series. He is a large and fuzzy green dragon-like creature of indeterminate species who runs Mopatop's Shop as its shopkeeper.
- Puppyduck (performed by Victoria Willing) – Mopatop's assistant. She is a cross between a duck and a dog. Puppyduck also has a fondness for strawberry jam.
- Mouse Family – A family of mice that live in the attic of Mopatop's shop.
  - Moosey Mouse (performed by Nigel Plaskitt) – A member of the Mouse Family. Since Mopatop and Puppyduck don't notice him, he tends to do whatever he wants. He is a recycled version of the mouse puppet used in The Muppet Christmas Carol which was later used for Stanley the Mouse in Jim Henson's Animal Show.
  - Mother Mouse (performed by Victoria Willing)
  - Father Mouse (performed by Brian Herring)
  - Great Uncle Mousiemillian – Moosey Mouse's great uncle.

=== Recurring characters ===
- Claudia Bird (performed by Susan Beattie) – A friendly neighbor of Mopatop. She is a recycled version of Winny from The Muppet Show.
- Lamont (performed by Nigel Plaskitt) – A sloth who is a deliveryman. He is a recycled version of the Lamont the Sloth puppet from Jim Henson's Animal Show.
- Odd-Job Gerald (performed by Brian Herring) – A rabbit who does odd jobs for Mopatop.
- Grace The Delphinium (performed by Alison McGowan) – A cheerful flower that resides in Mopatop's Shop. She is a recycled version of one of the flowers from The Muppet Show.
- Professor Fingle Fangle Fargle (performed by Nigel Plaskitt) – An inventor who has contributed some of his inventions to Mopatop's Shop.

== Broadcast history ==
=== United Kingdom ===
The series premiered on CITV on 4 January 1999.

=== International ===
==== North America ====
From 3 September 2001 to 6 September 2002, the series was aired on Treehouse in Canada.

On 9 May 2013, it was shown on YouTube during the first series and partial clips of series 2-4. in North America after a 5-year wait.

== Episodes ==
Series
Series	Episodes	Originally released	
Series	Episodes	First released	Last released
1	65	4 January 1999	14 June 1999
2	65	1999	2000
3	65	Fall 2000	Spring 2002
4	65	2002 (Non-US countries)	2003 (Non-US countries)

=== Series 1 (1999) ===
No. in series	Title
TBA	"Wrong Ringer"
2	"This Way to the Garden"
3	"Flea Power"
4	"Hop for the Shop"
5	"Hiccups"
6	"Ghosts"
7	"Upsy Daisy"
8	"Worries"
9	"Trouble With a Puddle"
10	"Horns"
11	"No Mice for Sale"
12	"The Seed"
13	"No Job Too Small"
14	"Moon Dreams"
15	"Hug A Bug"
16	"The Whizzy"
17	"Nowhere For a Square"
18	"Grand Opening"
19	"Shake A Shake"
20	"Mr Grizzle's Laugh"
21	"Nothing"
22	"Teething Trouble"
23	"Simply Sorry"
24	"Monty's Fuzzy Wuzz"
25	"Ants"
26	"Something Special"
27	"Singa Songa"
28	"Hairy Fairy"
29	"Whispers"
30	"Nodding Off"
31	"Flowers"
32	"Home Sweet Home"
33	"Ship Ahoy"
34	"You Are What You Are"
35	"The Do-What-I-Say"
36	"Bright Ideas"
37	"Surprise Party"
38	"Musical Sounds"
39	"Surprises"
40	"The Perfect Tail"
41	"Cock-A-Doodle Bee"
42	"The Happy Flapper"
43	"No Sea"
44	"Easy Peasy"
45	"Thingamajig"
46	"Wind"
47	"The Brave Canary"
48	"The Flying Chicken"
49	"Warm Snow"
50	"The Magic Teeny"
51	"Cold Feet"
52	"A Secret"
53	"Sniffly Whiffler"
54	"Singalotti"
55	"The Big Bicycle Race"
56	"Swapsies"
57	"Dancin' on the Shop"
58	"Find The Way You Are"
59	"The Fly"
60	"Go Slow"
61	"Fast Run"
62	"Mud"
63	"Fishing"
64	"Teasy Sneezy"
65	"Whistles"

=== Series 2 (1999-2000) ===
No. in series	Title
1	"Where's the Blue Paint?"
2	"Princess Lulabelle"
3	"Light Up My Life"
4	"Meesy Mouse"
5	"Mervyn Muddle"
6	"Whatever Next?"
7	"The Gobbledegook"
8	"Sea Tree House"
9	"Pop Star"
10	"The Wizard's Wand"
11	"Doctor Zuckermonster"
12	"The Neenoo"
13	"Helping Hands"
14	"Tweet! Roar!"
15	"Flying Carpet"
16	"Rosey Nosey"
17	"The Grumblegrouch"
18	"Weirdy Beardy"
19	"Splish! Splish! Splat!"
20	"Magic Cakes!"
21	"Feathers"
22	"Hidey Seekies"
23	"Rude Dude"
24	"Bath Buddy"
25	"I Want To Be a Unicorn"
26	"The Do Wah Be Do"
27	"Hair! Hair! Everywhere!"
28	"Smells"
29	"One Of Those Days"
30	"The Flootle Toot"
31	"Ears"
32	"Ducky Dog"
33	"Robbers In The Shop"
34	"The See Me Not"
35	"Runaway Socks"
36	"A Shopping Trip"
37	"Keys"
38	"Real Cool Shoes"
39	"Nellie the Belly Dancer"
40	"What's In An Egg?"
41	"Rumble! Rumble!"
42	"The Magic Rabbit"
43	"Silly Stephen"
44	"Mouldylocks and the Three Pears"
45	"How Scary Is That?"
46	"Animal Choir"
47	"Bruno Butterfingers"
48	"Thinking Cap"
49	"Hullabaloo"
50	"Little Miss Kissy Kiss"
51	"Puppyduck's Granny"
52	"Flower the Leader"
53	"Backwards Forwards"
54	"Stuck In A Bucket"
55	"Load of Old Rubbish"
56	"Ice Screams!"
57	"Mirror, Mirror"
58	"Mac and The Lollystalk"
59	"The Bigulator"
60	"Mouse Count"
61	"Snores"
62	"Gluey Gloop"
63	"Midip"
64	"Dream the Dream"

=== Series 3 (2000–2002) ===
No. in series	Title
1	"Mopatop of the Pops"
2	"Bad Leaf Day"
3	"Ali Doolally"
4	"Humdinger"
5	"Jumpety Bumpety"
6	"Clothez Fit for a King"
7	"Lots of Laughs"
8	"Spic and Span"
9	"Silly Things"
10	"Mischievous Monkey"
11	"Colour me Mopatop"
12	"I've Got Plenty of Muffin"
13	"Mr. Philling's Teeth"
14	"Mr. Puniverse"
15	"Spaghetti Tree"
16	"Cinderfella"
17	"Penguins, Pegs and Pirates"
18	"Smart Trousers"
19	"Whoop Mmmrrr Zingading"
20	"Big Game"
21	"Rigid Robot"
22	"Quick March"
23	"Penguins"
24	"What's in a Name"
25	"Stan the One Man Band"
26	"Chattering Charlie"
27	"Sir Gooseberry"
28	"The Bouncing Pengolinos"
29	"The Heebie Jeebie"
30	"The Orange and the Sporange"
31	"Mattresses"
32	"The Toadstool's Always Fresher"
33	"Voices"
34	"Three Sale"
35	"Fish out of Water"
36	"Keep Fit"
37	"Old Dog, New Tricks"
38	"Hooray Henry"
39	"Dragon Breath"
40	"The Argument"
41	"An Old Story"
42	"Wet, Wet, Wet"
43	"Tweetentoot"
44	"Moosey the Pigeon"
45	"Anything & Everything"
46	"Knowledgeable Nedra"
47	"Baddy NoNo"
48	"High"
49	"Fantastic Fancy Outfit"
50	"Stormy Gust"
51	"Again Again"
52	"Oh, What a Night"
53	"Invisible Storage"
54	"Shadow"
55	"Worry and Fret"
56	"A Ah Ee"
57	"Flower Power"
58	"Flatcap Frankie's Shop"
59	"A Rhyme of My Own"
60	"Cuddle a Cactus"
61	"Quickie Slowgo"
62	"Arabella Angel"
63	"Snowflakes"
64	"Oh Christmas Tree"
65	"Thank You"

=== Series 4 (2002–2003) ===
No. in series	Title
1	"Party Time"
2	"Funny Fruit"
3	"Dun Dun Dun"
4	"Flea Orchestra"
5	"One Big Eyebrow"
6	"Fast Furry Five"
7	"The True Princess"
8	"A Short Knight"
9	"The Fuzzlegump"
10	"The Interrupting Cow"
11	"The Fairy Godfather"
12	"The Big End"
13	"Bored"
14	"Smell the Cheese"
15	"If Wishes Were Fishes"
16	"Feet Up"
17	"Big Hand"
18	"Holly Happyhog"
19	"Big Bad Pig"
20	"Feeling Fruity"
21	"The Hole"
22	"Babysitting"
23	"Meesey's Friend"
24	"Toy Box"
25	"Vampy the Buffet Slayer"
26	"Mopatop's Birthday"
27	"Dora the Disco Queen"
28	"Plunk!"
29	"Mad Hattie's Tea Party"
30	"Granny Knit Wit"
31	"The Magical Cleaning Machine"
32	"It's Only Rock n Roll"
33	"Live Art"
34	"The Lightbulb Bug"
35	"Malvina the Magician"
36	"Looking Good"
37	"Under Arrest"
38	"A Grumpy Carrot"
39	"Jitterbug"
40	"Mrs. Wishy Washy"
41	"Jack Out of the Box"
42	"Finishing Chilly"
43	"The Pie Piper"
44	"The Big Banger"
45	"What a Spectacle!"
46	"On Your Skates"
47	"Polishing B's"
48	"Mini Holidays"
49	"The Royal Wave"
50	"The Lost Temper"
51	"A Noise for Mr. Racket"
52	"Little Fred Riding Hood"
53	"Rocky"
54	"Socks"
55	"Swap Shop"
56	"Nosy Parker"
57	"Grand Slam"
58	"Silly Sausages"
59	"Moosey's Dream"
60	"Pet Chair"
61	"Odd Job's New Job"
62	"Spots"
63	"Clappers"
64	"The Great Strawberry Jam Sandwich Crisis"
65	"Goodbye"
