= Louise Gold =

English puppeteer, actress and singer (born 1956)

Louise Gold (born 1956) is an English puppeteer, actress and singer whose career has spanned more than five decades. She is known for puppetry on television and roles in musical theatre in the West End, as well as other television, film and voice roles.

Gold was raised in London, beginning training in the arts. She began to appear in musical theatre in the mid-1970s. She was a puppeteer and voice actress for The Muppet Show, for four seasons from 1977, and later for Sesame Street, and she has performed voice and puppet work on various other Muppet films, albums and television specials. She was a founder of, and lead puppeteer for, the satirical television show Spitting Image from 1984 to 1986 and occasionally thereafter.

Gold's appearances in musical theatre shows in the West End include Joe Papp's London production of The Pirates of Penzance in 1982. She has played such roles as Mrs Johnstone in Blood Brothers, Reno Sweeney in Anything Goes, Kate in Kiss Me, Kate, Tanya in Mamma Mia!, Phyllis in Follies, Baroness Bomburst in Chitty Chitty Bang Bang, Miss Andrew in Mary Poppins, Mrs Sowerberry and Mrs Bedwin in Oliver!, and Mazeppa in Gypsy. She was a regular performer in the Lost Musicals concert productions in London in the 1990s and performs in her own cabaret act.

== Early life ==
Gold was born in London, to parents who were active with Unity Theatre in London. Her father was John Gold (1920–1998), a journalist, and her mother was an actress, Una Brandon-Jones (1916–2010). Her brother, Max (born 1958), is also an actor. Gold trained at the Arts Educational Schools from age 11.

== Early career, television and puppeteering ==
Gold made her professional debut in 1973, while still in her last year of school, in the Christmas pantomime Dick Whittington and His Cat, as Fairy Bowbells, at the Malvern Festival Theatre. She played in the musical Hair on tour in Britain in 1974. In 1975–76, she played Rachel in Joseph and the Amazing Technicolor Dreamcoat at the York Theatre Royal and then on tour (as Rachel and Potiphar's Wife).

In 1977, Gold joined The Muppet Show, during the show's second season, where Jim Henson trained her as a puppeteer. She played several characters during her four seasons with the show, including Annie Sue Pig. She also sang on several of The Muppets' albums and was often paired vocally with Jerry Nelson. She was a puppeteer in the films The Great Muppet Caper (1981) and The Dark Crystal (1982), and she appeared in various other Muppet series and specials. Muppet chronicler Christopher Finch wrote that Gold was "the most versatile female puppeteer to work on The Muppet Show [and] the only British member of the cast." During these years, she continued to appear in musicals and plays in between her commitments to The Muppets. Among her non-puppeteering television appearances, Gold was featured as Mrs Tyler, a Goodwife, in the first series episode "Witchsmeller Pursuivant" of Blackadder (1983). The same year, she appeared as Maureen Bedford in episode two of For 4 Tonight, a talk-show spoof. In 1991, she played the domineering Private Elsa Bigstern in two episodes of 'Allo! 'Allo!.

From 1984 to 1986, and occasionally thereafter, Gold was a lead puppeteer and voice on the satirical television show Spitting Image and was the lead singer (as Nancy Reagan) on their first single, "Da Do Run Ron", a pastiche of The Crystals' "Da Doo Ron Ron", released in 1984. Gold was the first puppeteer hired for the show and "helped out with the Spitting Image pre-pilot, so she naturally became the 'consultant' for the hiring [and training] of the rest" of the puppeteers. Peter Fluck, a creator of the show, commented, "Louise Gold always did the Queen and the mannerisms and facial expressions she put into it were wonderful. It was very exciting because this lump of clay we modelled with a fairly neutral expression came to life."

Gold's later puppeteering work includes the title character, Fughetta Faffner, in The Ghost of Faffner Hall (1989), a Muppet music education TV Series. She played several of the characters on Roland Rat The Series broadcasts in 1986 and 1988, Sesame Street in the early 1990s, on Mopatop's Shop in the early 2000s, and in The Muppet Christmas Carol (1992) and Muppet Treasure Island (1996). In 1992, Gold played Sally Spook in The Spooks of Bottle Bay. In 1995 and 1997, she played characters on series 2 and series 3 of Jim Henson's Animal Show with Stinky and Jake, including Tizzy Bee, an early example of a computer generated image puppet.

Gold lent her voice to an Australian puppet television programme in 2006, Five Minutes More. Gold was featured as a guest puppeteer, portraying the character of Babs (the female termite), on Transmission Impossible with Ed and Oucho on BBC 2 television. She appeared in seven episodes broadcast from May to August 2009. In 2013–2014, Gold starred in That Puppet Game Show, a celebrity game show on BBC One, operating three of the puppet characters. She reprised her role as Annie Sue Pig in the 2014 film Muppets Most Wanted, also operating a Muppet kangaroo. Also in 2014, she puppeteered on the CBeebies television series The Furchester Hotel, co-produced by Sesame Street. She plays Funella Furchester, the mother in a family of "cheerfully incompetent monsters" who own a hotel for monsters. In the Netflix series The Dark Crystal: Age of Resistance, which premiered in 2019, she voices and is the puppeteer for Maudra Argot and is also the puppeteer for The All-Maudra, skekAyuk/The Gourmand and Onica.

== Stage roles to 1995 ==
From 1982, Gold began to appear in West End musicals. The first of these was as Isabel in the Joseph Papp production of The Pirates of Penzance (1982–83; playing the role of Edith in the 1983 film adaptation of the production). Her other stage roles in the 1980s included Divine Dixie Diva in Mrs Cole's Music Hall at the Mill at Sonning (1984–85); Katisha, Countess of Grantham, in MetroPolitan Mikado, adapted from The Mikado by Ned Sherrin and Alistair Beaton at Queen Elizabeth Hall (1985); Bev in Angry Housewives at the Lyric Hammersmith Studio (1986); Mrs Johnstone in Blood Brothers at Watermill Theatre (1986); Maggot Scratcher in Sink the Belgrano! at Mermaid Theatre (1986); Sister Mary Amnesia in Nunsense at Fortune Theatre (1987; and singing on the original London cast album); Fanny Brice and other comedians in Ziegfeld (1988) at the London Palladium (which held the record, according to the Guinness Book of Records, for "Greatest Theatrical Losses"); and Dick Whittington in Poppy at Half Moon Theatre (1988–89).

Gold next starred as Reno Sweeney in Anything Goes at Prince Edward Theatre (1990, replacing Elaine Paige; and on the 1995 studio cast album). In the summer of 1991 at Open Air Regents Park she played Titania in A Midsummer Night's Dream and Adriana in The Boys from Syracuse (then toured as Adriana; "[W]hen the gleefully statuesque, not-so-pure Gold ripped into the splendid trio of "Sing for your Supper", we would have believed anything"). Throughout the 1990s, Gold was a regular performer in the Lost Musicals concert productions, taking roles in fifteen of them and singing in associated BBC radio broadcasts. One of these was the British première of Kurt Weill's One Touch of Venus at the Barbican Centre in 1992, in which Gold sang the title character, which she reprised in another Lost Musicals production at the Lindbury Studio Theatre, Royal Opera House, in 2000. These productions included four Cole Porter musicals in which Gold starred in roles that had been written for Ethel Merman.

Gold was Gussie in Merrily We Roll Along at Haymarket Theatre, Leicester (1992; and on the 1993 cast album). She next played Sara Jane Moore in Assassins at Donmar Warehouse (1992–93) and toured in Noël/Cole: Let's Do It, a Cole Porter and Noël Coward revue (1994 and 1995, beginning in Memphis, Tennessee; and on the cast album). She then played the title role in the stage musical adaptation of Calamity Jane at the Leicester Haymarket (1994–95). Gold appeared in Our Country's Good in 1995 as Lieutenant Will Dawes and Liz Morden, together with her brother Max Gold as Captain Arthur Phillip and John Wisehammer, at Edinburgh's Royal Lyceum Theatre. Later that year, with the same cast, at the same theatre, the two performed in The Caucasian Chalk Circle, with Louise as Tractor Driver and Grusche, and Max as Soldier, Executioner, Blockhead, Lavrenti, Trooper, Blackmailer and Groom.

== Stage roles since 1996 ==
In 1996, Gold toured as Mrs Silvia Tebrick, the title character (who transforms into a fox in full view of the audience) in the musical adaptation of Lady into Fox. After this, she starred as Dunyasha the Royal Shakespeare Company's production of The Cherry Orchard at the Albery Theatre in London and on tour (1996–97), followed by another summer in Regents Park as the title character in Kiss Me, Kate (1997). Paul Taylor, writing in The Independent, declared, "Louise Gold is a comically commanding figure – outdoing herself in campy gorge-rising revulsion and contentious, drop-dead postures on each successive verse of 'I Hate Men'. This is... delivered here by performers who really know how to pace the song". She was back at the Fortune Theatre as Lizzie Curry in 110 in the Shade (1999; one of the "Lost Musicals" series). The Stage commented, "Louise Gold also shines in the role of Lizzie, revealing her emotional torment in 'Old Maid', and an overwhelming joy in 'Is It Really Me?'" The last of Gold's Lost Musicals roles in the series for almost a decade was as May Daly/Mme Du Barry in DuBarry Was a Lady at Her Majesty's Theatre in November 2001 (which she had also played as part of the series in 1993).

She played Tanya in Mamma Mia! for two years at the Prince Edward Theatre (2000–02) followed by Phyllis in Follies at the Royal Festival Hall (2002). The Observer wrote, "Louise Gold's Phyllis is versatile and formidable: injured queen one moment, vamp the next." The Guardian found her "wonderfully acerbic". During the summer of 2003, she performed at the Festival Theatre, Chichester, playing the Duchess of Plaza-Toro in The Gondoliers and starring as the fairy characters in The Water Babies. She then starred as Dotty Otley in Noises Off at the Piccadilly Theatre (2003). This was followed by Baroness Bomburst in Chitty Chitty Bang Bang at the London Palladium (2004–05). Critics noted, "Gold always gives excellent value in musicals: she’s talented, funny and energetic"; and "The highlight of the show for me has to be Christopher Biggins and Louise Gold as Baron and Baroness Bomburst. If they are not the funniest and most outrageous double act in the West End, I would love to see who could outdo them."

Gold had another long run as the tyrannical Miss Andrew in Mary Poppins at the Prince Edward Theatre (2006–08). In February 2008, she was the stoic widow O'Brien in Next Door's Baby. From December 2008 to January 2011, Gold appeared in Oliver!, as Mrs Sowerberry and Mrs Bedwin, at the Theatre Royal, Drury Lane. She sings these roles on the cast album. On Sundays in August and September 2010, while still performing in Oliver!, she returned to the Lost Musicals series, as Alice Challice in Darling of the Day, earning warm reviews. In 2011, she appeared as Montana in Mexican Hayride, another instalment of the Lost Musicals series. She played Berthe, the grandmother, in Pippin, in 2011–2012 at the Menier Chocolate Factory. In the autumn of 2014, she played Mazeppa in Gypsy at the Chichester Festival Theatre. That production transferred to the Savoy Theatre in the West End in March 2015, with Gold earning critical praise.

Gold portrayed Yente in the Menier Chocolate Factory revival of Fiddler on the Roof from November 2018 until March 2019, which then transferred to the Playhouse Theatre in the West End.

== Other performances ==
Gold appeared in the 1985 film Billy the Kid and the Green Baize Vampire, as the reporter, Miss Sullivan, and the 2000 film Topsy-Turvy, as Rosina Brandram, one of the original Gilbert and Sullivan performers, who plays Katisha in The Mikado during the course of the story.

Gold has also done a significant amount of radio and recording work and performs in her own cabaret show, which includes some puppeteering. She returned to television in 2011, guest-starring as a judge on a June 2011 episode of Coronation Street and as aunt Annie in an episode of the children's TV show Scoop, titled "Come in Digby, Your Time's Up".

== Personal life ==
Gold lives with the actor James Vaughan. They have one son, Louis.

== TV and films ==
- The Muppet Show (1977–1981) – Afghan Hound, Annie Sue Pig, Lou, Mary Louise, Tootie, Zelda Rose, additional Muppets
- The Great Muppet Caper (1981) – Annie Sue, Lou, additional Muppets
- The Muppets Go to the Movies (1981) – Popcorn Girl, additional Muppets
- The Dark Crystal (1982) – skekAyuk/The Gourmand (puppeteer)
- Blackadder (1983) – Mrs Tyler
- For 4 Tonight (1983) – Maureen Bedford
- The Pirates of Penzance (1983) – Edith
- Spitting Image (1984–1986) – Queen Elizabeth II, Nancy Reagan, Various
- Billy the Kid and the Green Baize Vampire (1985) – Miss Sullivan
- The Tale of the Bunny Picnic (1986) – Mother Bunny
- Roland Rat: The Series (1986; 1988) – Various
- The Ghost of Faffner Hall (1989) – Fughetta Faffner, Tootie, additional Muppets
- Allo 'Allo! (1991) – Private Elsa Bigstern
- Sesame Street (early 1990s) – Bob Lackey, Bonnie Rabbit, Charmin', Diva LaDiva, Maria, Super Nanny, The Grand Royal Square Lover, additional Muppets
- The Spooks of Bottle Bay (1992) – Sally Spook
- The Muppet Christmas Carol (1992) – Mrs Dilber, Spider, additional Muppets (uncredited)
- The Secret Life of Toys (1994) – Raisin, Hortense, Daffodil, additional Muppets
- Jim Henson's Animal Show (1995; 1997) – Bunnie the Bear, Kiki the Rattlesnake, Mavis the Frog, Rhonda the Rat, Tizzy the Bee, additional Muppets
- Muppet Treasure Island (1996) – Brool the Minstrel, Original, Tourist Rat
- Topsy-Turvy (2000) – Rosina Brandram
- Mopatop's Shop (early 2000s) – Little Miss Kissy Kiss, Marsha Mouldylocks, Princess Lulabelle, Scary Mary, Shula the Shark,
- Five Minutes More (2006) – Florrie
- Transmission Impossible with Ed and Oucho (2009) – Babs
- Coronation Street (2011) – Judge
- Scoop (2011) – Aunt Annie
- That Puppet Game Show (2013–2014) – Various
- Muppets Most Wanted (2014) – Annie Sue, Wanda
- The Furchester Hotel (2014) – Funella Furchester and others
- Strike Back: Retribution (2017) – Crowther
- The Dark Crystal: Age of Resistance (2019) – Maudra Argot (voice and puppeteer), The All-Maudra, skekAyuk/The Gourmand, Onica (puppeteer for these characters)
- Doctors (2023) – Julie Exton
- The Piper (2023) – Katherine Fleischer
