= Monkey (character) =

British advertising character

Monkey and Al (portrayed by Johnny Vegas), as shown on one of ITV Digital's advertisements.

Monkey (also known as Munkeh, The Monkey, ITV Digital Monkey or PG Tips Monkey, and often pronounced /ˈmuŋkɛ/ in imitation of Johnny Vegas' Lancashire accent) is a puppet advertising character in the form of a knitted sock monkey. He was first produced by The Jim Henson Company via their UK Creature Shop, his puppeteers are Nigel Plaskitt and Susan Beattie, he was formerly voiced by comedian Ben Miller and is now currently voiced by comedian Ivo Graham.

Monkey has appeared in advertising campaigns in the United Kingdom for both the defunct television company ITV Digital and the tea brand PG Tips, as well as being occasionally featured in TV programmes, and making more obscure appearances. Monkey's first appearance was 11 July 2001, featuring in advertisements for ITV Digital. Monkey is notable as one of a small number of advertising characters to eclipse the popularity of the product they advertise and also to be reused to advertise a completely different product.

== ITV Digital ==
A series of high-profile adverts for ITV Digital featured the laid-back, droll and composed Monkey (in a variety of T-shirts) playing the straight man to the comedian Johnny Vegas's womaniser of a character "Al". Monkey was one of the few positive public relations successes of ITV Digital. Purchasers of ITV Digital were sent a free soft toy Monkey with their subscription, a sitcom series featuring the duo was conceptualized and was to air on ITV, but was likely never filmed, and was never aired regardless likely due to the imminent collapse of ITV Digital shortly after in 2002.

For a period during the advertising campaign and after ITV Digital's bankruptcy, the original promotional Monkey toys were in high demand and short supply. One sold for £150 at the bankruptcy auction and they were selling for several hundred pounds on eBay, where customers could also find replica Monkey knitting patterns delivered by email selling for several pounds. Later, The Gadget Shop purchased the remaining promotional toys from ITV Digital's liquidators and sold them through their retail stores. These saw a boost in popularity after an appearance in the second series of award-winning British sitcom The Office.

== Legal dispute ==
As Monkey was created and owned by advertising agency Mother rather than by ITV Digital itself, he was the subject of a legal dispute as both claimed the rights to the character. This prevented his use for some time, despite many organizations being keen to acquire the rights. The dispute was eventually resolved by both parties agreeing to donate the intellectual property rights for Monkey to Comic Relief.

Following the resolution of the dispute, Monkey made several small appearances in other media unrelated to ITV Digital, mostly before his appearances in PG Tips media, such as a small cameo appearance in the 2001 airing of "The Record of the Year", and 2003's Comic Relief. He was due to make a guest appearance at the 2002 BRIT Awards but was later pulled out due to restrictions. Johnny Vegas appeared without Monkey on an ITV Digital related airing of the Frank Skinner Show, speaking about the recognition he received from the ITV Digital Advertisements whilst Frank Skinner held up a Soft Toy of Monkey. In 2003, Monkey made a small appearance in a Walker's Crisps advertisement in collaboration with Comic Relief, and the BBC commissioned a variety show to be hosted by Monkey, but with no mention of Johnny Vegas at All. A pilot of the series was filmed titled "Watch with Monkey" which featured Dawn French and the Ukulele Orchestra of Great Britain. However, the pilot was never aired on TV for unknown reasons.

== PG Tips ==
Promotional poster of A Tale of Two Continents

In January 2007, Monkey and Vegas reprised their double act in a new series of advertisements for PG Tips tea. The first advertisement was named "The Return" and the adverts make reference to PG Tips' popular series of adverts featuring live chimps which ran between 1956 and 2002, as well as to ITV Digital going out of business (low audience figures, piracy issues and an ultimately unaffordable multi-million pound deal with the Football League led to the broadcaster suffering massive losses, forcing it to enter administration in March 2002), it features a troubled Monkey being dropped off at Al's home, where Monkey expresses his dismay and embarrassment towards ITV Digital's collapse to Al, stating that he abandoned Al and disappeared for that reason, the two end up reuniting and making a fresh start, now advertising PG Tips.

PG launched a website selling the newly branded "PG Monkey" merchandise with profits being donated to Comic Relief, who still own the intellectual property rights. The online shop has since closed but during promotions PG Tips have given away free mini-Monkeys packaged with their tea.

On 1 May 2024, PG Tips officially retired the Monkey character, stating that he was having a "well-deserved retirement".

On 7 May 2025, one year after his official retirement, Monkey made his grand return to the brand where it follows his new life with his wife Alice (also known as Mrs. M), portrayed by Emily Atack. The voice of Monkey in this campaign is now provided by Ivo Graham instead of Ben Miller, Johnny Vegas did not return as Al in the newest advert.

=== Mini movie ===
Monkey also appeared in a short advertising film which was shown in cinemas at the beginning of selected showings of Horton Hears a Who, The Spiderwick Chronicles, Hannah Montana 3D and The Game Plan. The film was released on 21 March 2008. The film is called A Tale of Two Continents and has Monkey portraying various historical figures as he attempts to make the perfect cup of tea in the Kenya tea farms and then safely take it across the world to England for The Queen. The film was also given away on DVD with special packs of PG Tips tea.

== Characteristics ==
=== Early life ===
In Monkey - Hero of Our Time, Monkey writes that his "parents owned a toy shop"; however, this was forced into closure in '1982'. He said "as my parents were clearing away and throwing out what was left of the stock, my mother came across me, stuck behind a pile of empty cardboard boxes" and "she took me home and painstakingly restored me back to my former glory - cleaning me, re-stuffing me and sewing me up. Her love for me was so great that I amazingly found myself able to move and speak." Soon afterwards he claimed that his first words to her were "Put the kettle on, eh Mum? I'm parched.".

=== Personality and habits ===
Monkey is sometimes portrayed as being quite cowardly; for example his refusal to take responsibility for dropping a ceramic bowl dating back to 3000 BC, despite being filmed doing so,and also being accounted for "running away" from Al after ITV Digital's collapse, an event which Al feels bad about, as noted in the “Return” advert. He is also prone to miserliness, having admitted that he re-uses discarded plasters he finds in swimming pools. Monkey hoards both his and Al's wages, deliberately neglecting to inform the naive Al of the fact that they are in fact paid for their work, stating "I don't bother Al with details" and that his money is "safely invested in a portfolio of bananas". Despite his turbulent relationship with Al, the two share the same bed.

Monkey is shown to be very passionate about tea, his favourite serving method being "three stirs clockwise, two stirs back, one and three quarters sugars". He vehemently insists that tea bags should precede milk when brewing. His exact species is never clarified; Monkey himself denies being a chimpanzee (the CHimp logo on his tea-shirt puns on CH sounding like the Chinese word for tea), and his response to Al's idea that he may be "half monkey-half chimp" is limited to "speak for yourself". Though he claims to be a "ladies' monkey", he is caught by Al surfing dating sites, giving exaggerated descriptions of his physical appearance. He is sometimes shown wearing a woman's nightcap, a sheath dress and a ballet tutu. He gets distressed if tea is made in the wrong order, and has shown fearful reactions to the idea of him being merchandised by companies.

=== Monkey's following and merchandising ===
When the ITV Digital first aired, Monkey was instantly famous, due to this, ITV Digital offered Monkey Plushies in packages alongside the ITV Digital Box. The Monkey boxes contained humorous instructions on how to replicate the adverts and to watch TV with him, with quote "Watching TV will never be the same, it will feel somewhat better", Once Monkey became the mascot of PG Tips, the company offered smaller monkey replica toys compared to the ITV Digital ones, though rarer, larger sized replica toys were discovered to have been made, a smaller monkey doll with suction cups was also made for cars, PG Tips also merchandised a large mug in the shape of Monkey's head, in similar fashion to the Gromit mug, which also came with a monkey-themed teaspoon.

== See also ==
- List of fictional primates
