= Stephen Deutsch =

American film score composer

- Born: July 17, 1945 (age 81); Brooklyn, New York, United States
- Genre: Electronic music
- Occupation: Film score composer
- Years active: 1976–present
- Website: stephen-deutsch.com

Stephen Deutsch (July 17, 1945) is a filmmaker, professor, and film score composer who has composed over 30 scores for film, theatre, radio, and television. His many collaborations with the playwright Peter Barnes include Jubilee (2001), the Olivier Award-winning play Red Noses (1985) and the feature film Hard Times (1994).

== Career ==
He was a sound designer/composer on two films, Wild South and Postcards from, Applecross, which he also directed.

He has published one novel about music: Zweck. His second novel, Champion, was set in France and Germany in the 1930s was published in July 2020. He was editor of The Soundtrack and The New Soundtrack journals from 2007-2018.

Deutsch was educated initially in the United States (initial training - Juilliard Preparatory Division; BMus - SMU; MA - San Francisco State College). In 1971, he and two partners established Synthesiser Music Services, Ltd., an electro-acoustic studio in London.

At Bournemouth University, he was Professor of Post-Production. In 1992, he founded the University's PGDip/M.A. in Electro-Acoustic Music for Film and Television (later called Composing for the Screen). He was also Senior Tutor in Screen Composition at the National Film and Television School.
