= That Puppet Game Show =

British TV show featuring Jim Henson puppets

- Genre: Comedy Game show
- Created by: Jamie Ormerod
- Written by: George Jeffrie; Bert Tyler-Moore; Dawson bros Tim Inman
- Directed by: Richard Valentine
- Presented by: Dougie Colon
- Starring: Dave Chapman; Louise Gold; Brian Henson; Nigel Plaskitt; Colleen Smith; Victor Yerrid
- Composer: Paul Farrer
- Country of origin: United Kingdom
- Original language: English
- No. of series: 1
- No. of episodes: 8

Production
- Executive producers: Derek McLean; Brian Henson; Martin Baker
- Producer: Andrew Nichols
- Editors: Nick Peto; Ian Moffat
- Running time: 45 minutes
- Production companies: BBC Entertainment; The Jim Henson Company

Original release
- Network: BBC One
- Release: 10 August 2013 – 5 January 2014

That Puppet Game Show is a British television series broadcast on BBC One between 10 August 2013 and 5 January 2014. The show was made by the BBC in conjunction with The Jim Henson Company and featured the Miskreant Puppets from Puppet Up! in their first family-related appearance. The show was hosted by a puppet character "Dougie Colon" and featured celebrities playing games alongside puppet characters. On 25 October 2013, it was announced that the show had been axed after the show had attracted largely negative press reviews and struggled in the ratings.

== Format ==
Each week two celebrities go head to head in a number of games, hoping to win £10,000 for their chosen charity. They compete in subjects such as sport, science, celebrity, nature, music and mental agility. Each of the games is run and hosted by a different puppet character, who is an "expert" in their field.

In between each of the games, backstage scenes feature the experts and crew. There is also a family watching the game show on TV who make comments after each of the games are played.

== Characters ==
Many of the puppet characters were recycled from characters in various other Henson productions.

- Dougie Colon (performed by Dave Chapman) – The puppet host of the BBC One comedy series "That Puppet Game Show" who also hosts "The Puppet End Game". In "Staying Alive," it is revealed that Dougie doesn't think that Amber O'Neill is very smart. Dougie also bears a resemblance to Vernon Kay and even thinks so himself. Dougie rose to fame as a radio DJ on Bolton FM. He also worked as a warm-up act for Ant & Dec for a number of years before mainstream presenting on BBC One in 2013. Dougie's last name is pronounced "cologne."

=== Experts ===
The first series aired for seven episodes, each starring different celebrity guests.

- Dr. Heimlich Strabismus (performed by Brian Henson) – A scientist who is the science expert and the host of "Paddlestar Galactica" and "Blow By Blow". Despite being a scientist, Dr. Strabismus has shown signs of being a little bit stupid. In "Staying Alive," 5 things have been revealed about him and his family: He was born on 11 March, he thinks he is a Capricorn but he is really a Pisces, he cloned himself, he doesn't believe in horoscopes, and his mother was a German pretzel vendor. He is a recycled version of Dr. Scientist from Puppet Up!.
- The Amazing Ian (performed by Brian Henson) – An armadillo who is the mental agility expert and the host of "Nosey Neighbor" and "Glow Balls". The Amazing Ian is the only non-human expert in the show. It is ironic that he is the mental agility expert since he has been shown to be idiotic a lot. He is a recycled version of the armadillo puppet that was used for Dooley the Armadillo from Jim Henson's Animal Show, Annette the Armadillo from Bear in the Big Blue House, and Joe the Armadillo from Kermit's Swamp Years.
- Jemima Taptackle (performed by Louise Gold) – A sports expert who hosts "Punch Your Lights Out". In "Manschool," it is revealed that Eddie considers Miss Taptackle to be the most masculine expert around despite her being female. She is a recycled and redressed version of the Cavewoman from Puppet Up!.
- Eddie Watts (performed by Dave Chapman) – A music expert who hosts "Saucissong" and "Cheek to Cheek". Eddie has been shown to be the smartest out of all the experts. In 'Jake's Dark Secret', it is revealed he is allergic to chocolate. He currently holds the record for being the male to present his games the most with 5 games. Eddie has a crush in Mancie O'Neill. He is a recycled version of a male Whatnot from The Wubbulous World of Dr. Seuss.
- Jake Hamilton-Jones (performed by Victor Yerrid) – A nature expert who hosts "Dart Attack" and "Bird Droppings". In multiple episodes, Jake and Eddie have been shown to be close friends. He is a recycled version of Mr. Guy from Puppet Up!.
- Amber O'Neill (performed by Louise Gold) – A showbiz expert who hosts "Life's a Speech". Amber is the younger sister of Mancie O'Neill. In "Staying Alive," it is revealed that Amber believes in horoscopes. Amber holds the record for female to host her game the most, presenting her game 5 times. She is a recycled version of a female greenish Whatnot from The Muppet Show.

=== Crew members ===
The following are the crew members that help to run this show:

- Mancie O'Neill (performed by Colleen Smith) – The television producer of That Puppet Game Show who is the older sister of Amber O'Neill. Mancie has a crush on Eddie Watts just like he does with her. She is a recycled version of the female curly-haired blue Whatnot from The Muppet Show.
- Udders McGhee (performed by Nigel Plaskitt) – A cow who is the Chairman of the Studio that is part of his own media empire. He has been best friends with each of the presidents of the United States, but couldn't stand George Bush. In "Boss' Son," it is revealed that he has a son named Josh.
- Clyde Stravinsky (performed by Victor Yerrid) – A crab who is the scorekeeper. Clyde is married, but has developed a crush on Tess Daly. He is a recycled version of the red crab from Puppet Up!.
- The Hot Dogs – The Hot Dogs appear in different roles on the show like being in "Saucissong" and "Nosey Neighbor". They are recycled versions of Frankie Frank and the Footers from CityKids.
  - H.D. - A Hot Dog who is the announcer of "That Puppet Game Show".
  - Nicky KO - A Hot Dog from North America. She and Seamus work as contestant trainers for the "Punch Your Lights Out" game.
  - Seamus O'Platt - A Hot Dog from Ireland. He and Nicky work as contestant trainers for the "Punch Your Lights Out" game.
- Fenton (performed by Nigel Plaskitt) - A tortoise who serves as a showrunner for the show. He is a recycled version of the tortoise puppet that was previously used for Penelope the Yellow-Footed Tortoise from Jim Henson's Animal Show and Jeremiah Tortoise from Bear in the Big Blue House.
- Neil - A crew member on "That Puppet Game Show." He is a recycled version of the large caveman from Puppet Up!.
- Monkey and Mouse (performed by Victor Yerrid and Brian Henson) - An unnamed monkey and mouse janitor duo. During the show, the Monkey Janitor and the Mouse Janitor are usually seen in the basement talking about the present situation that is occurring backstage. The monkey janitor is a recycled version of Joey the Monkey from Late Night Buffet with Augie and Del while the mouse janitor is a recycled version of Cool the Kangaroo Rat from Jim Henson's Animal Show.

=== Other characters ===
- The Family - At intervals during the show a family consisting of Mum (performed by Louise Gold), Dad (performed by Dave Chapman), their son and daughter, and grandmother are seen watching the show. The Dad is a caricature of Stephen Fry, the Mum and son are recycled version of the Whatnots from The Wubbulous World of Dr. Seuss, and the grandmother is a recycled version of the Old Lady from Puppet Up!

== Games ==
- Saucissong – Hosted by Eddie Watts, each celebrity has to put a line of singing Hot Dogs in the correct order so they sing a line from a famous song correctly. The first celebrity to get the hot dogs in the correct order singing the song correctly wins the points.
- Punch Your Lights Out – Hosted by Jemima Taptackle, the celebrities race against each other to see who can punch out the most of 100 lights stuck to their bodies in 45 seconds. The celebrity who punches out the most lights wins the points.
- Nosey Neighbor – Hosted by The Amazing Ian, the celebrities have to jump up and down behind a garden fence to see if they can spy what the Hot Dogs are getting up to on the other side. Ian will ask them a series of questions about what is going on and the nosiest neighbor will win the points.
- Paddlestar Galactica – Hosted by Dr. Strabismus, the celebrities play against each other in a cross between ping pong and inter-galactic warfare with each player trying to knock their opponents floating planets out of orbit to claim the points. The name of this game is a spoof of the Battlestar Galactica franchise.
- Life's A Speech – Hosted by Amber O'Neill, each celebrity has to read a speech from an autocue, sounds easy enough. However, the twist is that some of the words have been left blank. The player who fills in the most blanks correctly while they are performing their speech wins the points.
- Cheek To Cheek - Hosted by Eddie Watts, the celebrities have to slow dance together and try and work out what song they are dancing to....the catch is the songs are being played ultra-slow. For every song they get right, a point will be added to their total.
- Dart Attack – Hosted by Jake Hamilton-Jones, the celebrities take it in turn to fire darts at each other with a blow pipe while the other is strapped to a spinning wheel. This game show will see which player can hit the most targets and win the points.
- Glow Balls – Hosted by The Amazing Ian, the celebrities each have to memorize the positions of their glowing balls in a ring of mostly non-glowing balls. The balls only glow when the lights are off, when the lights are on will they be able to find them? whoever picks 3 out of 5 glowing balls first wins.
- Blow By Blow – Hosted by Dr. Strabismus, the celebrities race to see who can blow out 100 candles before the other and win the points. The 100th candle is covered by a glass container and is pulled up by a Hot Dog holding a fishing rod.
- Bird Droppings – Hosted by Jake Hamilton-Jones, the celebrities have to memorize a series of bird calls, return the call, and catch the egg laid by the bird in their bucket. The player who catches the most eggs wins the points.
- That Puppet End Game – Hosted by Dougie Colon, the celebrities face quick-fire questions on nature, science, sport, music, show business, and mental agility from all of the experts in a final push to win the £10,000 charity prize.

== Episodes ==
No.	Title	Contestants	Points	Games	Original release date	Charity (chosen by winner)
1	"Sacked"	Katherine Jenkins; Jonathan Ross	8; 13	Nosey Neighbour; Life's a speech Punch Your Lights Out; Saucissong	10 August 2013	Macmillan Cancer Support
Katherine Jenkins and Jonathan Ross compete against each other to win money for the charity of their choice. Meanwhile, Udders McGee instructs Mancie to pick one of the experts to fire.
2	"Dougie's Birthday"	Freddie Flintoff; Gary Lineker	10; 8	Bird Droppings; Paddlestar Galactica; Punch Your Lights Out; Saucissong	17 August 2013	AF Foundation
It is Dougie's birthday as Gary Lineker and Freddie Flintoff compete against each other to win money for the charity of their choice. Meanwhile, The Amazing Ian believes he wasn't invited to the party after the show and things take a bad turn when he unintentionally insults Dougie via an email.
3	"Manschool"	Jack Dee; Alex Jones	10; 7	Cheek to Cheek; Life's a Speech; Paddlestar Galactica; Punch Your Lights Out	24 August 2013	RNLI
Music expert Eddie Watts is looking for love, as celebrity guests Jack Dee and Alex Jones contend with a record-spinning tortoise and a sabotaged autocue in the fantastic world of the Jim Henson Company, all in a bid to win £10,000 for charity.
4	"Jake's Dark Secret"	Shane Richie; Claudia Winkleman	10; 5	Bird Droppings; Life's a Speech; Nosey Neighbour; Punch Your Lights Out	31 August 2013	Noah's Ark
Shane Richie and Claudia Winkleman compete against each other to win money for the charity of their choice. Meanwhile, everyone starts believing that Jake Hamilton-Jones ate Eddie Watts. But did he really eat Eddie? Note: This is so far the first episode to have another expert replace an absent one. Amber O'Neill replacing Eddie because he hadn't returned yet.
5	"Flatshare"	Mel Giedroyc; Vernon Kay	10; 7	Dart Attack; Glow Balls; Life's a Speech; Saucissong	7 September 2013	Tanzania Development Trust
After The Amazing Ian accidentally burned down his house, he moves in with Eddie driving Eddie insane. Meanwhile, Mel Giedroyc and Vernon Kay battle each other out in order to win £10,000. Note: Mel is the first female celebrity contestant to win on this show.
6	"Staying Alive"	Tess Daly; Ronan Keating	5; 10	Blow by Blow; Dart Attack; Life's a Speech; Saucissong	14 September 2013	Marie Keating Foundation
Tess Daly and Ronan Keating face each other in a bid to win £10,000 for charity. Meanwhile, Dr. Strabismus' horoscope says that he is going to die, but he doesn't think so.
7	"Superstition"	Richard Hammond; Oritsé Williams	10; 6	Cheek to Cheek; Life's a Speech; Paddlestar Galactica; Nosey Neighbour	29 December 2013	The Children's Trust
Music expert Eddie Watts is sent into a spin after his lucky watch is broke by Dr. Strabismus. Richard Hammond and Oritse Williams from JLS ping-pong and slow dance their way in a battle to claim the £10,000 charity prize.
8	"Boss' Son"	Gabby Logan; Kevin Bridges	9; 4	Nosey Neighbour; Bird Droppings; Life's a Speech; Blow by Blow	5 January 2014	The Disabilities Trust
It's bad news for Mancie when Udders McGee's son Josh arrives to give his judgement on the show. Gabby Logan and Kevin Bridges contend with sun-bathing hot dogs and fire hazards all in a bid to win £10,000 for charity.

== Cast ==
=== Puppeteers ===
- Dave Chapman – Dougie Colon, Eddie Watts, Dad, Josh McGee (ep. 8)
- Louise Gold – Amber O'Neill, Jemima Taptackle, Mom
- Brian Henson – Dr. Heimlich Strabismus, The Amazing Ian, Mouse Janitor, Hot Dog
- Nigel Plaskitt – Udders McGee, Hot Dog, Fenton the Tortoise
- Colleen Smith – Mancie O'Neill
- Victor Yerrid – Clyde Stravinsky, Jake Hamilton-Jones, Monkey Janitor

==== Additional puppeteers ====
- William Baynard (a misspelling of Banyard)
- Warrick Brownlow-Pike
- Josh Elwell
- Andrew Heath
- Beccy Henderson
- Katherine Smee
- Andrew Spooner - George
- Olly Taylor
- Michael Winsor
