= Mock Turtle =

Fictional character from Alice in Wonderland

- Alice character
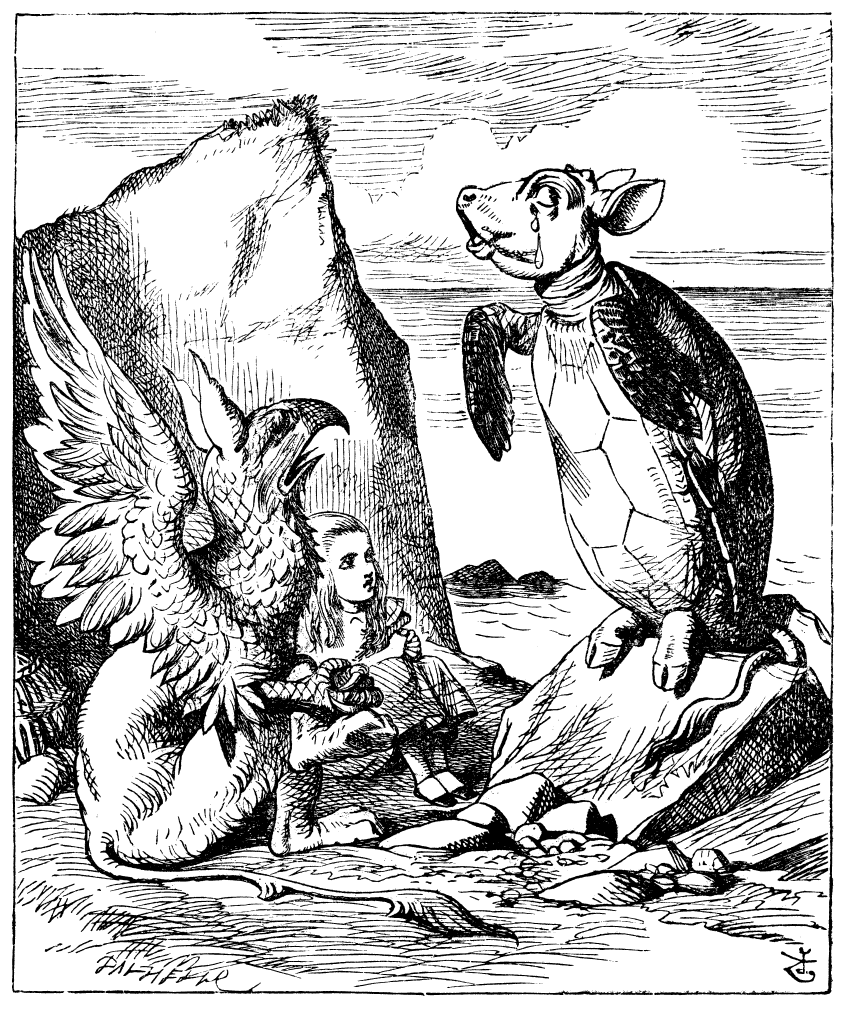
- The Gryphon and the Mock Turtle, illustrated by John Tenniel
- First appearance: Alice's Adventures in Wonderland
- Created by: Lewis Carroll

In-universe information
- Species: Formerly a Turtle/Sea Turtle, now a Turtle/Cow hybrid
- Gender: Male
- Nationality: Wonderland

The Mock Turtle is a fictional character devised by Lewis Carroll for his popular 1865 book Alice's Adventures in Wonderland. Its name is taken from a dish that was popular in the Victorian period, mock turtle soup.

== Alice's Adventures in Wonderland ==
Then the Queen left off, quite out of breath, and said to Alice, "Have you seen the Mock Turtle yet?"

"No," said Alice. "I don't even know what a Mock Turtle is."

"It's the thing Mock Turtle Soup is made from", said the Queen.

Carroll enjoyed such puns on Victorian fashions and etiquette, and showed this frequently. The drawing by John Tenniel gives comedic value: mock turtle soup was made from calves' heads and feet to mimic the taste of real turtle soup, and Tenniel gives Carroll's creature the body and front flippers of a turtle and the head and feet of a calf.

Alice encounters the Mock Turtle with the Gryphon. The Mock Turtle is a very melancholic character; his sombre attitude is believed to be a result of his having once been a real turtle. He tells Alice his history of going to school in the sea. He says his teacher was an old sea turtle called Tortoise, and when Alice asks him why he was called Tortoise if he was a turtle the Mock Turtle answers, "We called him tortoise because he taught us!" ("tortoise" and "taught us" both being pronounced [tɔːtəs] in standard English:).

== Sources ==
- Carroll, Lewis (1998) [1865]. "Alice's Adventures in Wonderland". Alice: A Special Centenary Edition. London: Macmillan. ISBN 0-333-72272-8.
- Davidson, Alan (1999). The Oxford Companion to Food (first ed.). Oxford: Oxford University Press. ISBN 978-0-19-211579-9.
- Gardner, Martin; Mark Burstein, eds. (2015). The Annotated Alice (150th Anniversary ed.). New York: W. W. Norton. ISBN 978-0-393-24543-1.
