= Edward Melcarth =

American artist born in Louisville, Kentucky

- Born: Edward Epstein; January 31, 1914; Louisville, Kentucky
- Died: December 13, 1973 (aged 59); Venice, Italy
- Other names: Edward Epstein Jr., Edward Epstein, Edouard Melcarth
- Occupation: Artist
- Political party: Communist
- Parent(s): Lady Eva Mitchell Banks (born Eva Ehrmann) and Edward Epstein Sr.

Edward Melcarth (January 31, 1914 – December 13, 1973), was born as Edward Epstein in Louisville, Kentucky to Eva Epstein (born Ehrmann) and Edward "Eddie" Epstein Sr., a wealthy Jewish family. His grandfather was a noted distiller and liquor dealer, Hilmar Ehrmann and he was the nephew of Herbert B. Ehrmann and Sara R. Ehrmann. After his father died in February 1920, his mother, whose family discouraged her from becoming an opera singer, remarried to Sir Reginald Mitchell Banks, KC, and Member of Parliament for Swindon, in 1926. Eva and Edward then moved to the U.K. to live with Reginald, and Edward spent the next decade in Europe.

Edward changed his last name to Melcarth on February 10, 1936, after he rejected his religion, to reflect that of the Phoenician god Melqart. He was an openly gay, Jewish, and communist artist who preferred to work in painting, sculpture, and photography. Melcarth's circle included famous art collector Peggy Guggenheim (with whom Melcarth designed her famous 'butterfly framed' sunglasses that were popularized as "bat glasses" by Maila Nurmi as Vampira), as well as notable art collector Malcolm Forbes, who would was a collector throughout Melcarth's career and went on to also purchase the remaining collection of Melcarth's artwork after his death.

While he presented himself as openly homosexual, he did marry Joan Beer, a woman also known as Hansi Kostolany, in Paris during the summer of 1939. The couple eventually divorced in 1944 and he did not remarry. During World War II, he served as a seaman in the United States Merchant Marine.

Later in life, Melcarth moved to Venice, Italy where he lived until dying at age 59 on Friday, December 13, 1973. His obituary was published in the New York Times.

== Career ==
Melcarth left his home in the U.K. to pursue his personal interests and career, studied at Harvard University, the Chelsea College of Arts, and Stanley William Hayter's Atelier 17 in Paris, a notable print studio where European modernists gathered and produced limited editions. In the Fall of 1951, he returned to Kentucky and taught at the University of Louisville. The following year, he left the United States for Italy in February. There, he resided at the Casa dei Tre Oci, Venice. Melcarth later returned to the United States in November 1952. By 1953, he was residing in New York City and it became his primary residence.

His work did not follow Abstract Expressionism, which was popular at the time he was working and rather focused on figurative painting. He did this in a style he referred to as Social Romanticism, which used techniques similar to those of the Renaissance, rendering the mundane as extraordinary. His work revolved around masculinity, religion, portraiture, drug use, and the American scene. Melcarth's paintings of men and women riding motorbikes, enjoying the beach, and relaxing seem to enjoy looking and being looked at. The subject of his art included young, heterosexual, masculine men he had intimate relationships with who occupied jobs as blue-collar workers, sailors, hustlers, addicts, and trade positions. Often, the subjects depicted within his work were shared within other artists' work as well, including his roommate and close friend Thomas Painter. Painter was also Melcarth's connection to the sexologist Alfred Kinsey, who would later study the theme of homoeroticism within Melcarth's work. Melcarth and Painter also lived with the Kentucky-born artist Henry Faulkner in New York City for a short period of time following WWII. They shared friends, artistic interests and sexual partners.

Along with painting, Melcarth was also a photographer and sculptor. He took erotic photos of his sexual partners to sell or trade with other likeminded New Yorkers. Members of the group often hired the same models and, cruising together, they would occasionally secretively take pictures of sunbathers at Coney Island Beach.

Melcarth's friends and patrons included:

- Peggy Guggenheim
- Malcolm Forbes
- Gore Vidal
- Tennessee Williams
- Chick Austin
- R. Kirk Askew (whose portrait he painted in 1941)
- William T. Kempfer
- William Inge
- Van Day Truex
- Edgar Kaufmann, Jr.
- James Whitney Fosburgh
- Whitney Warren
- Virgil Thomson
- Leonard Whiting

His works are in the permanent collections of:

- Whitney Museum of American Art
- Museum of Fine Arts Boston
- Art Institute of Chicago
- Detroit Institute of Arts
- Kinsey Institute
- Crystal Bridges Museum of American Art
- Metropolitan Museum of Art
- Yale University Art Gallery
- Princeton University Art Museum
- Forbes Collection
- Faulkner Morgan Archive

He taught at Parsons School of Design, Columbia University, the University of Washington, the University of Louisville, and the Art Students League. His awards included a grant from the Institute of Arts and Letters in 1951, and its Childe Hassam purchase award in 1965, the Altman prize of the Chicago Art Institute in 1950, first prize for figure from the National Academy of Design in 1964 and its Thomas B. Clarke award in 1969. He was recognized as one of the top 19 young American artists by Life (magazine) in 1950, and they reproduced one of his paintings in color.

== FBI investigation ==
In January 1952, the United States Federal Bureau of Investigation opened an investigation against Melcarth due to potential Communist ties and his paintings of "scenes of leftist progressive aspect." The FBI files, which can be obtained through a Freedom of Information/Privacy Acts (FOIPA) request, detail information about his life and involvement with the Communist Party. Melcarth joined the Communist Party in 1944 and remained an active member until 1948, when he departed due to a minor disagreement with the official line on Yugoslavia, where Melcarth had visited in 1938. Following this initial involvement, it is said that he carried his Communist membership card with him and aligned with communist ideology for a majority of his life.

As part of his support for worker's rights, in 1952, Melcarth shared his plans to ship canvases to various union headquarters around the United States and invite the members to pay him whatever they think his paintings are worth. This led to the International Longshore and Warehouse Union, in San Francisco, receiving a 22' x 9' Melcarth painting commemorating their 1934 strike.

== Notable work ==
In 1943, Melcarth rode a British ship called the Aguillion, along with some other American volunteers, in order and work on the construction of air strips for allied forces in Persia. While there, Melcarth drove a trunk, and continued drawing and painting. In 1944, Melcarth joined the Merchant Marines and sailed on cargo ships until the cessation of hostilities. During this time, in November 1943, Melcarth illustrated for Fortune (magazine) on the construction project to build a road from the Persian Gulf to the Caspian Sea. The Fortune commission is seen as an early boost to his career and provided one of the most lively reportage features in the magazine as it surveyed the War.

In 1957, Melcarth painted a ceiling mural for the Lunt-Fontanne Theatre during their renovation. The ceiling mural depicted theatrical muses and was decorated with clouds, which hid ventilation openings.

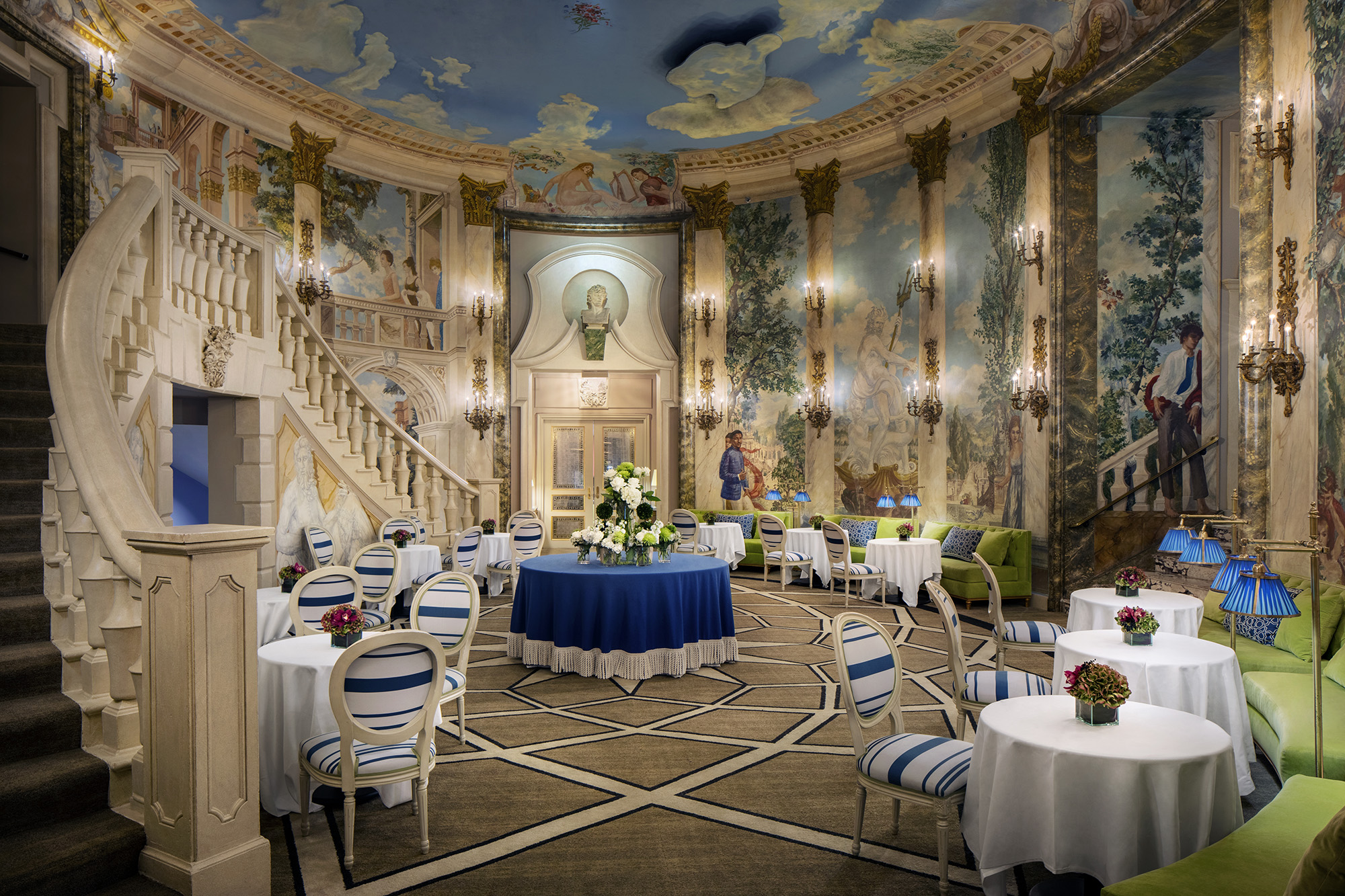
The Pierre Rotunda

In 1967 and 1968, Melcarth painted a trompe l’oeil mural in the rotunda of the Pierre Hotel in New York City. He sculpted busts for the space as well. The mural invited comparisons to Paolo Veronese's work at Villa Barbaro (1560–1), with Melcarth similarly mirroring the structure of the room and audience for the murals and inviting views through the Villa d' Este-like architecture into the Italianate landscape beyond. Baroque fountains with nude statues of Poseidon (with a mermaid) and Aphrodite (with a merman) similarly mediate the vistas opposite the grand staircase, where couples are viewed through illusionistic Corinthian columns. Some figures interact in the distance, while others pose provocatively beside a column, including male figures whose positioning recalls the open-stanced availability seen in Melcarth's hustlers. The mural included mythological characters alongside prominent members of New York's elite like Jacqueline Kennedy and Erik Estrada. After criticism, the hotel painted over the telltale facial details and gave the figures a more generic look. In 2016, the hotel restored the murals, the decorative plaster ceiling, marble stairs and stone walls. They also added LED strip-lighting runs the perimeter of the floor, shedding up-light onto the murals.

== Artwork ==
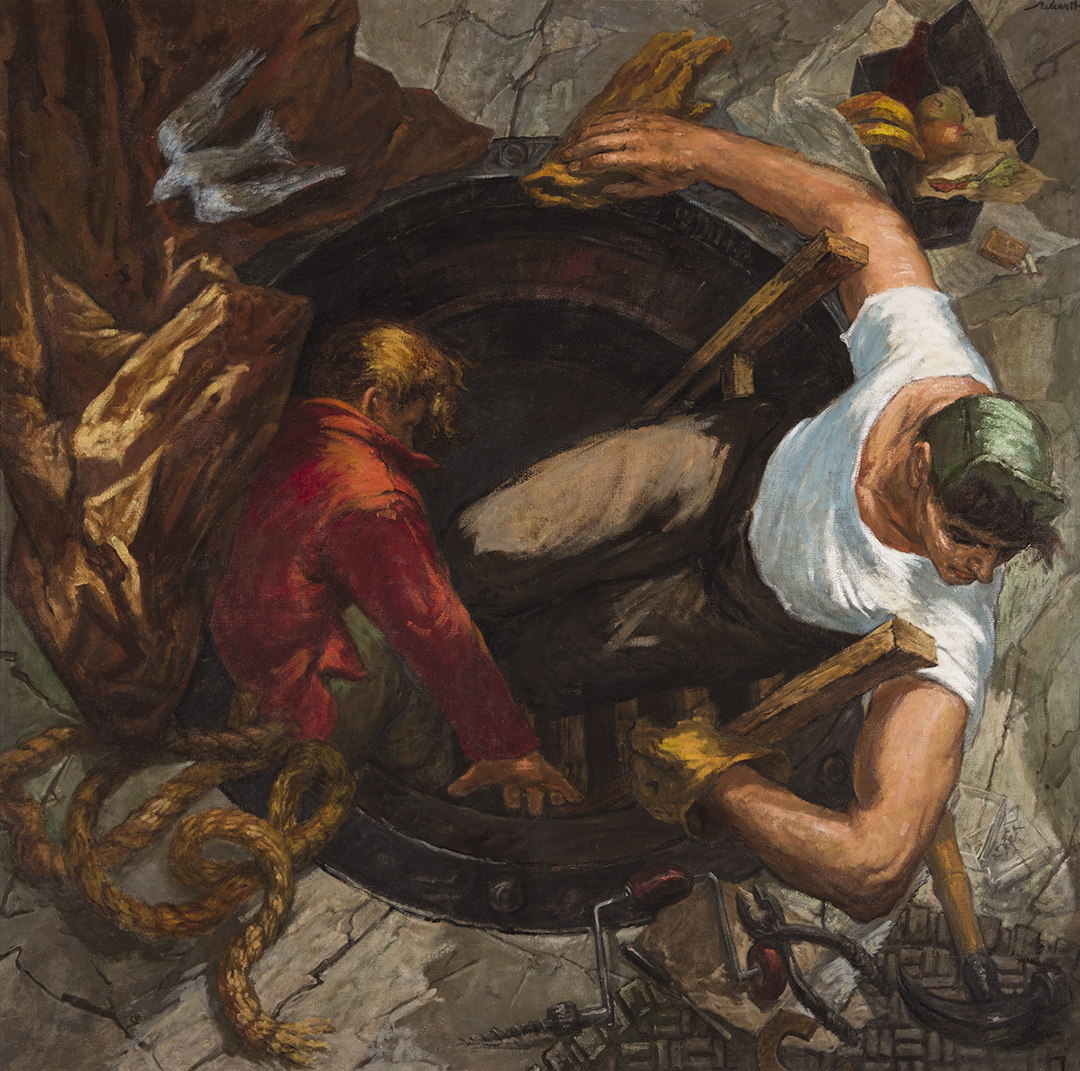
Edward Melcarth, Manhole, 1959, oil on canvas, 70 × 70 in. Crystal Bridges Museum of American Art.

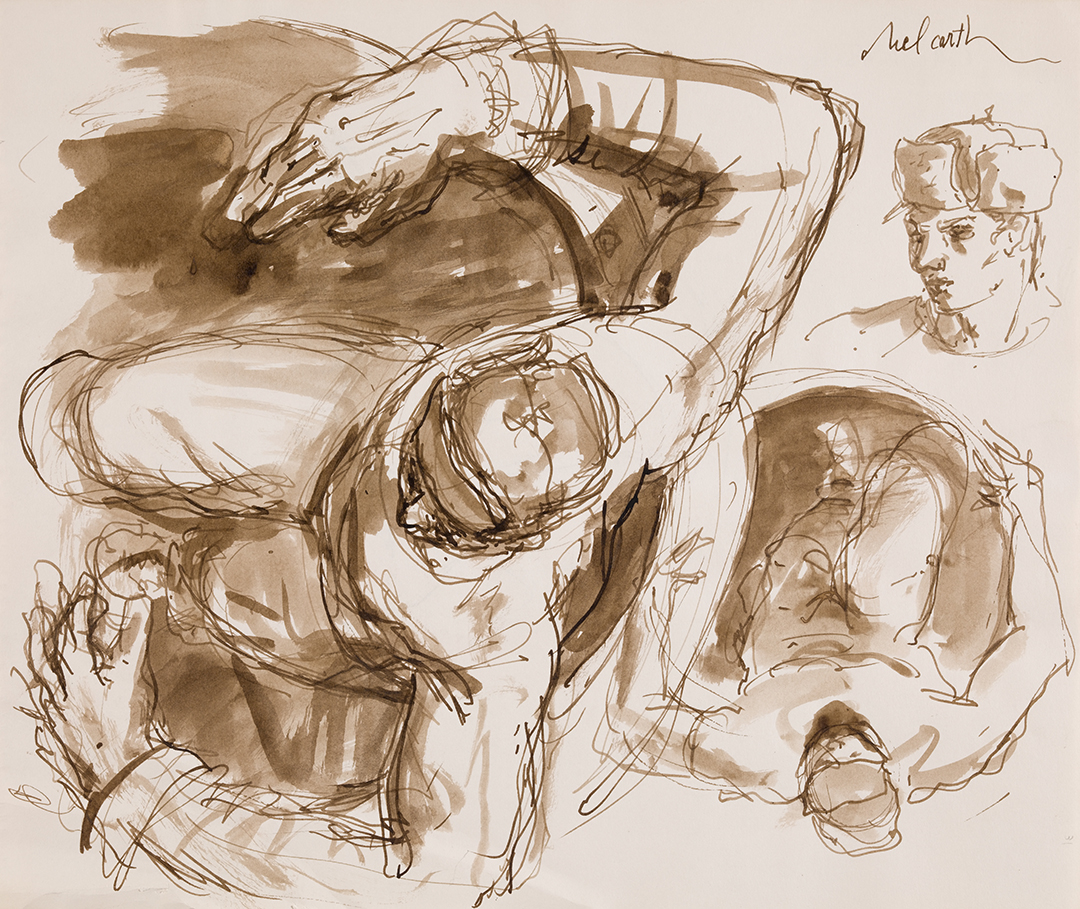
Edward Melcarth, "Study for Manhole"

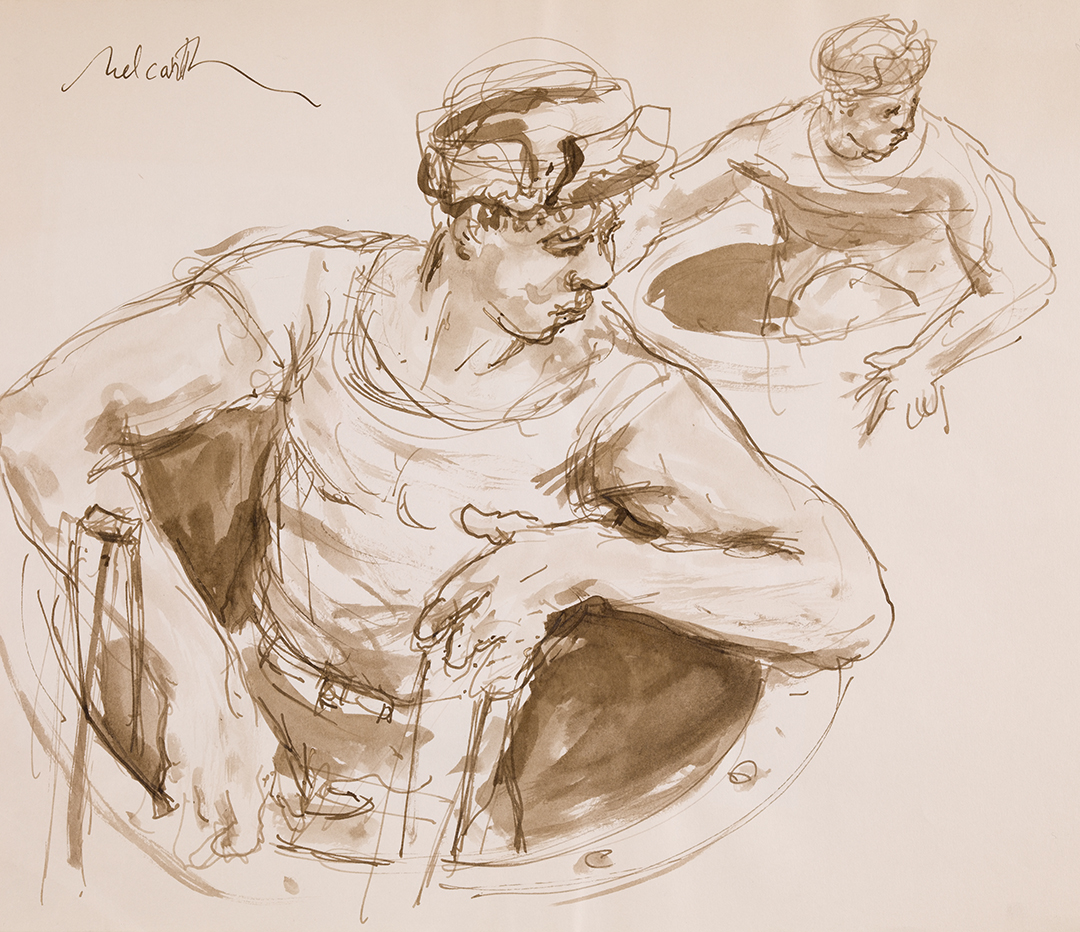
Edward Melcarth, "Study for Manhole"

== Legacy ==
The lack of recognition given to Melcarth during his life is speculated to be because of his identity as an openly gay, Jewish, and communist man. Melcarth, although previously overlooked by art historians as an influential figure of modern art, has received recent recognition for his contributions to queer art. Today, Melcarth's work is held in notable collections and he is receiving a resurgence as the subject of recent critical writing and analysis.

Melcarth mentored many artists during his career, including Robert Morgan, Paul Resika, and Richard Taddei. Morgan studied painting under Melcarth at the Art Student's League and was invited by him to Venice in 1970 to assist him with completing several large paintings and a sculpture group commissioned by Malcolm Forbes. Taddei assisted Melcarth with the painting of the trompe l’oeil mural at the Pierre Hotel and, in 1972, traveled to Italy where he lived and worked alongside Melcarth. Resika met Melcarth in Italy when he moved in next door and, in return for Resika's help painting a mural, Melcarth offered to instruct him in figure composition and in how to paint in the style of the Venetian masters. In 1952, Resika and Melcarth exhibited together in Venice and the exhibition was mentioned in TIME (magazine).

Malcolm Forbes and his son, Christopher Forbes were avid collectors of Melcarth's work and commissioned many artworks throughout his career. Then, after Melcarth's death in 1973, the bulk of his work remained unsold and in storage, until finally acquired by the Forbes Collection in 1980 and 1991.

In 1995, Virgil Burnett published Edward Melcarth: a hercynian memoir, a biography and collection of work of Edward Melcarth, who Burnett studied under at Columbia University.

In 2018, in conjunction with the Faulkner Morgan Archive, two exhibits took place in Lexington, KY that showcased Melcarth's work. Edward Melcarth: Points of View, was hosted by the University of Kentucky Art Museum from January 13 to April 8. Edward Melcarth: Rough Trade, was exhibited from January 13 to February 17 of the same year at Institute 193. In 2019, The Forbes Collection donated over 100 of Melcarth's works to the Faulkner Morgan Archive–a nonprofit organization that focuses on sharing Kentucky's LGBTQ+ history.

In 2021, Aaron Lecklider published Love's Next Meeting: The Forgotten History of Homosexuality and the Left in American Culture which features Melcarth's Last Supper (ca. 1962) on the cover, and discusses his work in the introduction.
