= Red Harvest (play) =

Red Harvest is a play in three acts by Walter Charles Roberts that uses pages from an American Red Cross nurse's diary detailing her experiences working with the Red Cross in France on the Western Front during World War I as its source material. Set in American Red Cross Hospital 111, a field hospital in Jouy-sur-Morin, the play takes place in 1918 at the time of the Battle of Château-Thierry. The play centers around the head nurse, Zinna Meek, as she struggles to lead the under staffed and under supplied hospital through a dangerous time when the hospital itself is experiencing air raids, shell fire, and a large crowd of severely wounded soldiers, many of whom are difficult surgical cases.

Produced by Brock Pemberton and The Theatre Foundation of America, Red Harvest premiered on Broadway on March 30, 1937 at the National Theatre. The cast included Leona Powers as Zinna Meek, John Alexander as Sergeant Bennett, Walter Burke as Courier Rockman, Michael Carlo as Private Transky, Frances Creel as Sally Farrell, Malan Cullen as Charlotte Van Worter, Lloyd Gough as Private Hawley, Allan Hale as Private Breen, Jeanne Hart as Rose Clarkson, Martha Hodge as Carol Whiting, Phyllis Langner as Holly Farrell, Drue Leyton as Ruth Bissley, Elizabeth Love as Veronica Ellis, Robert Marcato as Courier, G.H.Q., Doro Merande as Belle Smith, Margaret Mullen as Dorothy Bruffel, Edwin Rand as Corporal Topley, Carl Benton Reid as Major McCann, M.C., C.O., Amelia Romano as Mary Luddy, Chester Stratton as Private Adams, Joan Sudlow as Soeur Therese, and Frederic Tozere as Major David Allison, M.C.

Roberts was the head of the drama department at Ithaca College at the time his play premiered on Broadway.
