= Walter Burke =

American actor (1908–1984)

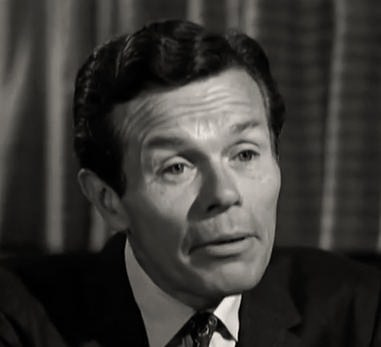
- Burke in an episode of One Step Beyond (1959)
- Born: Walter Lawrence Burke; August 25, 1908; Brooklyn, New York, U.S.
- Died: August 4, 1984 (aged 75); Woodland Hills, Los Angeles, California, U.S.
- Occupation: Actor
- Years active: 1925–1981
- Spouse: Kathryn Patricia Rooney (m. 1937; died 1956)
- Children: 4

Walter Lawrence Burke (August 25, 1908 – August 4, 1984) was an American character actor of stage, film, and television whose career in entertainment spanned over a half century. Although he was a native of New York, Burke's Irish ancestry often led to his being cast in roles as an Irishman or Englishman. His small stature and distinctive voice and face also made him easily recognizable to audiences even when he was performing in minor supporting roles.

== Early life and stage career ==
Walter Burke was born in the Brooklyn borough of New York City to Irish immigrant parents Bedelia (née McNamara) and Thomas Burke. His father bred trotting horses, with one farm each in Ireland and Scotland.

Burke began acting on stage as a teenager, making his Broadway debut in Dearest Enemy at the Knickerbocker Theatre during the 1925–1926 season. The following year he performed in the musical revue Padlocks of 1927 at the Shubert Theatre. He then joined the American Opera Company's troupe in January 1928, performing a non-singing role in an English-language adaption of Faust. He continued with that company through January 1930, taking part in adaptions of Madame Butterfly and Yolanda of Cyprus at the Casino Theatre. His other Broadway credits included Help Yourself! (1936), Red Harvest (1937), A Hero Is Born (1937), The Old Foolishness (1940), Under This Roof (1942), The Eve of St. Mark (1942-1943), The World's Full of Girls (1943), Sadie Thompson (1944-1945), Up in Central Park (1945-1947), Billy Budd (1951), Three Wishes for Jamie (1952), and Major Barbara (1957).

== Film ==
Burke debuted in Hollywood films in 1948, with The Naked City, and the following year had a memorable role in the Oscar-winning film All the King's Men. Burke would appear in twenty-two more films, and three more Broadway productions, but both film and the stage would soon take a backseat to his television work.

== Television ==
In 1951, Burke played a jockey in the early television series Martin Kane. From then until 1980, he would appear in episodes of 103 different television series, as well as three made-for-television movies. Though never a series regular, he often played different roles in multiple episodes of the same shows. In 1959–60, he appeared five times as Tim Potter in the ABC western series Black Saddle starring Peter Breck. That same season, he appeared on Andrew Duggan's Bourbon Street Beat and John Cassavetes's Johnny Staccato detective series. He portrayed defendant Freddie Green in CBS's Perry Mason in the 1959 episode, "The Case of the Jaded Joker," the first of five appearances in diverse roles. In 1959, he played the title character in the Tales of Wells Fargo episode "The Little Man." Between 1959 and 1969, Burke made guest appearances on five episodes of the western drama series Gunsmoke.

In 1960 he played prosecutor James Blackburn on Perry Mason in "The Case of the Ominous Outcast." Among his other roles he played a panhandler and a private detective. He guest-starred as Hatfield in the 1961 episode "The Drought" of the syndicated western series Two Faces West. In the 1962–1963 season, he appeared on the CBS anthology series The Lloyd Bridges Show. In the 1965–1966 season, Burke appeared on another ABC western, The Legend of Jesse James. Burke played a magician called "Zeno the Great" in a 1965 (first season) episode of Bewitched entitled "It's Magic". He portrayed Alfred Swanson in the 1965 episode "Movie Star Munster" (S1, Ep28) of the television series, The Munsters. Burke also appeared on an episode of Lost in Space, playing Mr. O.M. in "The Toymaker" (1967). He also appeared in an episode of "Wild Wild West" as the mayor of a town under siege, in Hogan's Heroes as the master safe cracker Alfie the Artiste, and in two episodes of "Bonanza", as Jesse in "Destiny's Child", and as an unsuspecting witness in a trial. Burke performed as well in the Western series The Virginian, portraying the character Billy Neal in the 1970 episode "The Gift".

== Personal life ==
Burke married Kathryn Patricia Rooney in 1937 and they had four children, Catherine, Margaret, Deborah and Leslie. Kathryn Rooney died on May 21, 1956.

Burke split most of his later life between Hollywood, where he worked, and his farm in Monroe County, Pennsylvania. While back east, he would sometimes teach dramatics at a local college.

== Death ==
On August 4, 1984, Burke died from emphysema while living at the Motion Picture & Television Country House and Hospital in Woodland Hills, California, and was laid to rest in Laurelwood Cemetery in Stroudsburg, Pennsylvania, alongside his wife.

== Broadway stage credits ==
- Dearest Enemy, Knickerbocker Theatre, (1925–1926) ... as ensemble
- Padlocks of 1927, Shubert Theatre, (1927) ... as performer
- Faust, Gallo Theatre, (1928) ... as A Soldier
- Madame Butterfly, Casino Theatre, (1930) ... as Registrar
- Yolanda of Cyprus, Casino Theatre, (1930) ... as Tremitus
- Help Yourself, Manhattan Theatre, (1936) ... as Frederick Bittlesby
- Red Harvest, National Theatre, (1937) ... as Courier Rockman
- A Hero Is Born, Adelphi Theater, (1937) ... as William / A Gentleman of Uncertain Age
- The Old Foolishness, Windsor Theatre, (1940) ... as Dan Dorian
- Not in Our Stars, Biltmore Theatre, (1941) ... as Kevlin Hoolihan
- Under This Roof, Windsor Theatre, (1942) ... as Shawn O'Shaughnessy
- The Eve of St. Mark, Cort Theatre, (1942–1943) ... as Private Thomas Mulveroy
- The World's Full of Girls, Royale Theatre, (1943) ... as Nick
- Sadie Thompson, Alvin Theater, (1944–1945) ... as Quartermaster Bates
- Up in Central Park, New Century Theatre (1945–1946) ... as Danny O'Cahane
- Billy Budd, Biltmore Theatre, (1951) ... as O'Daniel
- Three Wishes for Jamie, Mark Hellinger Theatre, (1952) ... as Power O'Malley
- Major Barbara, Martin Beck Theatre, (1956–1957) ... as Snobby Price

== Filmography ==
- The Naked City (1948) as Pete Backalis (uncredited)
- All the King's Men (1949) as Sugar Boy
- Mystery Street (1950) as Ornithologist
- The Killer That Stalked New York (1950) as Danny the Bellhop (uncredited)
- Dark City (1950) as George the Bartender (uncredited)
- Double Deal (1950) as Wally, Karne's Thug (uncredited)
- M (1951) as MacMahan
- The Guy Who Came Back (1951) as O'Mara
- Never Love a Stranger (1958) as Jimmy Keough (uncredited)
- The Crimson Kimono (1959) as Ziggy (uncredited)
- Let No Man Write My Epitaph (1960) as Wart
- Jack the Giant Killer (1962) as Garna
- Beauty and the Beast (1962) as Grimaldi
- How the West Was Won (1962) as Poker Player in wagon (uncredited)
- The Three Stooges Go Around the World in a Daze (1963) as Lory Filch
- The Wheeler Dealers (1963) as Billy Joe (uncredited)
- My Fair Lady (1964) as Bystander (uncredited)
- The Plainsman (1966) as Abe Ireland
- Double Trouble (1967) as Mate
- Stranger on the Run (1967, TV Movie) as Abraham Berk
- The President's Analyst (1967) as Henry Lux, FBR Chief
- Support Your Local Sheriff! (1969) as Fred Johnson
- Support Your Local Gunfighter (1970) as Morris
- Chandler (1971) as Zeno
- The Stone Killer (1973) as JD, marijuana dealer

== Television credits (partial) ==
- Martin Kane: "A Jockey Is Murdered" (1951) ... as Eddie Stevens
- Johnny Midnight as McVey in untitled episode
- Peter Gunn: "The Torch" (1958) ... as Ditto
- Tales of Wells Fargo "The Little Man" (1959) ... as Marty Saunders
- Gunsmoke: "Wind" (1959) ... as a Bystander
- Alfred Hitchcock Presents (1959) (Season 4 Episode 21: "Relative Value") ... as Benny
- Yancy Derringer: "Panic in Town" (1959) ... as Sneaky Joe
- Alcoa Presents: One Step Beyond: "Front Runner" (1959) ... as jockey Sam Barry
- Lawman: "Red Ransom" (1959) ... as Whiskey Jimmie
- Lawman (1961) S4 E15 "By The Book"...as Ernie
- Rescue 8: "Left Hook to Hades" (1959) ... as Mike Thompson
- Perry Mason: "The Case of the Jaded Joker" (1959) ... as Freddie Green
- Perry Mason: "The Case of the Ominous Outcast" (1960) ... as James Blackburn
- Sugarfoot: "The Mysterious Stranger" (1959) ... as Bartender
- The Man from Blackhawk: 2 episodes, "Death Is the Best Policy" (1959) as Tyce; "The Harpoon Story" (1960) ... as Tom Abbott
- Gunsmoke: 2 episodes: "Hinka Do" (S5E21 - 1960) ... as Herman & "Circus Trick" (S10E20 - 1965) ... as "Mr. Elko"
- The Alaskans: 3 episodes, "The Blizzard" (1959) and "The Devil Made Fire" (1960) ... as Jenks in both segments; "Kangaroo Court" (1960) ... as Sid Queed
- The Islanders: 2 episodes, "Operation Dollar Sign" and "The Phanton Captain" (1960) ... as Mesrob in both segments
- 77 Sunset Strip: 3 episodes, "The Double Death of Benny Markham (1960) ....as Benny Markham, "The Baker Street Caper" (1962) ... as Riordan, and "Terror in Silence (1963) .... as Joe Dolan
- Rawhide: "The Incident of the Deserter" (1960) ... as Mr. Dimity
- Bat Masterson: "Bat Trap" (1960) ... uncredited
- Tombstone Territory: "Memory" (1960) ... as Harry Ames
- Perry Mason: "The Case of the Missing Melody" (1961) ... as Jack Grabba
- The Lawless Years: "The Miles Miller Story" (1961) ... as Miles Miller
- G.E. True: "A Friendly Tribe" (1961) ... as L.B. Prentiss
- Bonanza: 3 episodes, "Bank Run" (1961) .... as Tim O'Brien, "Destiny's Child" (1966) .... as Jesse Pierson, "The Twenty-Sixth Grave" (1972) .... as Campbell
- Wide Country: "Good Old Uncle Walt" (1962) ... as Tim Mayhew
- Follow the Sun: "Annie Beeler's Place" (1962) ... as Gympy
- Empire: "Where the Hawk Is Wheeling" (1963) ... as Micah
- The Lloyd Bridges Show: "The Rising Moon" (1963) ... as O'Farrell
- The Outer Limits: "The Mutant" (1964)
- The Outer Limits: "The Invisibles" (1964)
- Perry Mason: "The Case of the Wooden Nickels" (1964) ... as Jerry Kelso, Panhandler
- Perry Mason: "The Case of the Crafty Kidnapper" (1966) ... as Private Investigator Adams
- This Man Dawson: "Plague" (1960) ... as "Jumpy" Higgins
- The Twilight Zone: "The Big Tall Wish" (1960) ... as Joe Mizell
- Hawaiian Eye: "Talk and You're Dead" (1961) ... as Kilgore
- Have Gun – Will Travel: Season 2 Episode 36 (1963) ... Mr. Abbott: A school teacher who disclosed information to Paladin about the murder of a man by the ex-sheriff.
- Arrest & Trial: "The Black Flower" (1964) ... as Hoby Osborne
- Mickey with Mickey Rooney: "For the Love of Grandpa Toddie" (1964) .... as Grandfather Toddie
- Bewitched: "It's Magic" (Season 1 Episode 16) (1964) ... Zeno the Great, a hapless magician
- The Munsters: "Movie Star Munster" (1965) ... as Alfred Swanson
- Hogan's Heroes: "The Safecracker Suite" (Season 1 Episode 27) (1966) ... Alfred Burke a.k.a. Alfie the Artiste, an English safecracking master
- The Fugitive: "Joshua's Kingdom" (1966) ... as Doc
- Batman: "Fine Feathered Finks" and "The Penguin's a Jinx", Episodes 3 and 4 (1966) as Sparrow
- Rango: "The Rustlers" (1967) as Brooks
- Lost in Space: "The Toymaker" (Season 2 Episode 18) (1967).... as the Toymaker, Mr. O.M. (Old Man)
- The F.B.I.: "The Two Million Dollar Hit" (1974) .... as Arnie Hellings
- I Dream of Jeannie: "One Jeannie Beats Four of a Kind" (1970) ... as The Boss
- The Big Valley (TV series) 4 episodes, "The Iron Box" (1966) ... as Young Billy, "The Disappearance" (1967) ... as George Gates, "Fall of a Hero" (1968) ... as T.J. Dyce, "Point and Counterpoint" (1969) ... as Ned Stokely
- Voyage to the Bottom of the Sea: "Terrible Leprechaun" (Season 4) (1968) ... as Leprechauns Mickey and Patrick
- Ironside: "All in a Day's Work" (Season 1 Episode 21) (1968) ... as the Informer
- Mission: Impossible: "Image" (Season 6 Episode 17) (1972) ... as Nate Ullstead
- Ghost Story "The Concrete Captain" (Episode 2) (1972) ... as Daniel
- Adam-12: "Backup 1-L20" (1972) ... as Billy Fuller
