= Paul Resika =

American artist (born 1928)

- Born: 1928 (age 97–98); New York City, New York, U.S.
- Occupations: Painter, educator
- Known for: Representational abstraction, landscapes, figure painting
- Movement: Post-World War II American painting
- Website: resika.com

Paul Resika (born 1928) is an American painter born and raised in New York City.

Resika is a former student of Hans Hofmann. He began exhibiting his paintings in New York City in the 1940s. He has had several dozen one-man exhibitions in galleries and museums, and his works have been included in hundreds of group exhibitions since the late 1940s until the present. Resika assisted, and later collaborated with artist Edward Melcarth.

He chaired the Parsons School of Design MFA program from 1978 to 1990. He is a member of the National Academy and the American Academy of Arts and Letters.

Resika's work is in the permanent collections of dozens of museums and corporations throughout the United States and the world, including the Metropolitan Museum of Art, the Munson-Williams-Proctor Arts Institute, the Museum of Modern Art, the National Academy, the National Museum of American Art, Washington, DC., the Indianapolis Museum of Art, the Palace of Culture, Warsaw, Poland, the Parrish Art Museum, Southampton, NY, and the Whitney Museum of American Art.

He has had solo exhibitions at The Century Association, New York (1982); Mead Art Museum, Amherst College, Amherst, MA (1991); Provincetown Art Association and Museum, Provincetown, MA (1997); and at numerous commercial galleries such as Alpha Gallery, Boston, MA; Lori Bookstein Fine Art, New York; and Salander-O’Reilly Galleries, New York.
