= Virgil Burnett =

- Born: January 11, 1928 (age 98); Wichita, Kansas, U.S.
- Died: 2012 (aged 83–84)
- Spouse: Anne Pippin Burnett

Academic background
- Education: Columbia University; UC Berkeley College of Letters and Science

Academic work
- Discipline: Fine arts
- Institutions: University of Waterloo

Virgil Burnett (1928-2012) was an author, illustrator, and professor of Fine arts at the University of Waterloo whose works have been published in both North America and Europe. He was a Fulbright Scholarship recipient.

He received the Quantrell Award.

== Personal History ==
Virgil Burnett was born in Wichita, Kansas on 11 January 1928 to Bertha and Virgil Burnett. His father was a flour and feed miller and a builder who traveled widely Burnett emigrated to Canada in 1972 to teach at the University of Waterloo.

== Education ==
Burnett received his undergraduate degree at Columbia University in New York. While there, he studied with Edward Melcarth, a painter who specializes in social realism. He was drafted into the Korean War in 1950 and trained as a combat engineer, and later served in Europe as an illustrator for a propaganda unit, the Fifth Loudspeaker and Leaflet Company. After two years of military service, he attended University of California, Berkeley and took a master's degree in Art History in 1956. His research focused on the influence of Eugène Delacroix's work in the French Romantic school, and the relationships between art and text. After being awarded a Fulbright Scholarship to continue his research in 1956, Burnett interacted with other expat artists in Paris and became close friends with other notable artists such as David Hill. Burnett was exposed to applications of style and expression in book art by French master printer and publisher Maurice Darantiere. The contact that Burnett had with Darantiere inspired him to pursue a career in the book arts.

== Fine arts works ==
The majority of Virgil Burnett's fine art works are illustrations. An important aspect of Burnett's work is the emphasis on the role of the illustrator to create new meaning within interpretations of a text.

Burnett illustrated the Folio Society boxed edition of The Rubaiyat of Omar Khayyam, published in London, 1970

== Writing ==
- Towers at the Edge of a World in 1980.
- Skiamachia (1982)
- A Comedy of Eros (1984)
- Farewell Tour (1986)
- Edward Melcarth - A Hercynian Memoir (1995)
- A Sentimental Dialogue (1996)
- The Old Met, Les Halles and Other Losses: A Memoir of the Post-War Years (2005)
- Scarbo Edge: A Romance (2008).

== Publishing ==
Burnett founded his own publishing house, Pasdeloup Press, in the 1960s, which published its first work in 1966, Le roi s'amuse.
