= The Lufthansa Heist =

2015 non-fiction book

The Lufthansa Heist: Behind the Six-million Dollar Cash Haul That Shook the World
- First edition
- Author: Daniel Simone, Henry Hill
- Language: English
- Subject: Lufthansa heist, robbery, organized crime, case studies
- Publication date: 2015
- Media type: Print, Ebook, Audiobook, Audible, Amazon Kindle unabridged Audio CD
- ISBN: 978-1-4930-0849-0 (Hardcover)
- Dewey Decimal: 364.16'209747243—dc23
- LC Class: HV6661.N721978 .H55 2015

The Lufthansa Heist: Behind the Six-Million-Dollar Cash Haul That Shook the World is a non-fiction book written by Daniel Simone in collaboration with Henry Hill. It was published by Lyons Press, an imprint of Rowman & Littlefield, on August 1, 2015.

== Background ==
=== Development ===
Simone approached Henry Hill and proposed to develop the Lufthansa project. Hill agreed, and Simone began debriefing him on a daily basis for an exhaustive two-year period. To corroborate Hill's account, Simone solicited the cooperation of Steve Carbone and Ed Guevara, the two FBI agents who spearheaded the Lufthansa investigation, and Ed McDonald, the US Attorney who was in charge of the case. Simone conducted his own research, and interviewed several former Mafia gangsters who were indirectly involved in the Lufthansa raid. (See Authors' Notes and Sources Page in The Lufthansa Heist). Simone also interviewed New York Police Detective Joe Coffey, who provided additional information regarding the failed investigation. Daniel Simone consulted court records and reviewed dozens of newspaper articles about the infamous robbery. In addition, Simone referenced television documentaries that describe and set forth the salient details of the event. Retired FBI Agent Steve Carbone wrote the Foreword in The Lufthansa Heist and Agent Ed Guevara wrote the Afterword. (See The Lufthansa Heist by Daniel Simone & Henry Hill Pages IX and 347).

=== Writing style ===
Daniel Simone wrote The Lufthansa Heist in the Narrative Non-Fiction genre`, a unique technique of writing non-fiction books in the fashion of a novel. This style enlivens the story with dramatization, character development, lifelike dialogues, and vivid scenes, lending the story a cinematic effect. The genre` was created by Truman Capote when he authored his magnum opus, In Cold Blood. Capote originally labeled this writing manner as Fictionalized Journalism, though ultimately the term evolved to Narrative Non-Fiction.

== Storyline ==
The book is about the 1978 robbery of the Lufthansa Airline cargo building at Kennedy Airport. This robbery stands as the largest unrecovered cash theft in history.

In 1967, Hill conspired with an Air France cargo foreman to burglarize the Air France high-value vault. Hill cleverly eluded the authorities and drove out of Kennedy Airport with $480,000 in cash and jewels. (in 1967 $480,000 equated to approximately $5,000,000 at present value). Later that evening, though, in the midst of celebrating his windfall, two prostitutes, who had represented themselves as advertising executives, robbed Hill out of $30,000. But despite this relatively minor setback, Hill's associates, members of the Lucchese Crime Family, considered the Air France robbery a substantial theft, and Hill rose in his ranks.

In the years following the Air France sensation, in collusion with air cargo workers, Hill became experienced in pilfering from airlines. Among other criminalities, they'd steal pricey shipments, extort from cargo companies, and hijack delivery trucks. In 1978, Hill and Jimmy Burke were released from prison. They'd served a five-year sentence for an extortion conviction unrelated to the airport thieveries. At that time, a Lufthansa shipping clerk, Louis Werner, owed gambling debts to a bookmaker, Marty Krugman, an associate of Hill. Werner was not in a financial capacity to settle with Krugman, but offered information on how to penetrate into the German Airline's cargo building, where cash and high valuables were stored. In exchange, the shipping clerk demanded for Krugman to forgive his gambling Krugman in turn relayed this proposal to Hill, who brought it to the attention of his crew chief, Jimmy "the Gent" Burke. Burke was affiliated with Lucchese Capo Paul Vario.

Burke selected six armed robbers from his Robert's Lounge Gang. On December 11, 1978, at 3:00 a.m., the gunmen entered Lufthansa Cargo Building 261 at Kennedy Airport and held hostage the night staff. Two of the perpetrators forced the supervisor to disarm the alarm system of the high-value vault and hauled out bundles of cash and jewels, totaling $6,000,000. (Approximately $42,000,000 at present value)

When the robbery was reported, several law enforcement agencies swarmed into the Lufthansa Cargo Complex. The Port Authority of New York and New Jersey Police, The New York Police Department, The Queens County District Attorney, and the FBI took immense interest in this crime of epic proportion. The book claims that a rivalry developed between them. The Lufthansa heist was the subject of national headlines for months to follow, and the book suggests that every law enforcement agent wished to assume control of the investigation, in order to take credit for solving the crime. In fact, the competition to dominate the case became so intense that the various law enforcement agencies threw one another off course by sabotaging their investigations. The winners were the FBI and the US attorney.

But for Burke and the Robert's Lounge Gang matters became problematic when one of their accomplices, Stacks Edwards, failed to deliver the getaway van to an auto wrecking yard for it to be destroyed. Instead, he parked it near a fire hydrant and spent the night snorting cocaine with his girlfriend. The police discovered the van and lifted fingerprints that matched those of the perpetrators, who had already been under suspicion. Consequently, Jimmy Burke ordered Stacks to be murdered.

For a variety of reasons, Burke murdered twelve additional individuals who were directly and indirectly involved in the robbery. The primary incentives for Burke to liquidate his associates were not to share the stolen cash, and to ensure they would not testify against him. In the interim, Louis Werner, the Lufthansa employee who collaborated with the perpetrators, was the only person arrested and convicted for his participation in the heist. Burke had shielded himself from Werner and dealt with him through an obscure intermediary. Thus Werner did not have first-hand knowledge as to who had masterminded and carried out the robbery. In the end, he wasn't in a position to assist the FBI in apprehending the culprits. Unable to provide the authorities incriminating information about the Lufthansa gunmen, he couldn't plea bargain and was sentenced to five years of incarceration.

Meanwhile, Henry Hill and Jimmy Burke had also orchestrated and were immersed in a widespread sports scandals, the Boston College basketball point shaving scheme. Hill claims that he recruited three Boston College players, Jim Sweeney, Rick Kunz, and Earnie Cobb, who for a share of the winning bets manipulated the games' final scores so to keep the point spread under the bookmakers' odds. But the plan veered off course. One of the point shaving scheme cohorts, Paul Mazzei, in possession of $180,000 belonging to Burke, Vario, and Hill, was instructed to go to Las Vegas to bet it on the Boston College games. Mazzei, though, absconded, and Hill & Company lost a large sum of money. In 1984, Cobb was found not guilty of involvement in the scheme after a two-week trial in Federal District Court in Brooklyn.

At the same time, Hill was distributing narcotics, for which he, his wife, and mistress were indicted and held without bail. In the course of the pre-arrest surveillance of Hill's phones, he repeatedly referred to one of his associates in the drug ring as "the big Irishman in Albany". Hill's prosecutor, the Nassau County District Attorney, was convinced that "the big Irishman" was then New York State Governor Hugh Carey. Eager to prosecute a prominent Governor, the District Attorney, without investigating further, gave Hill full immunity for the drug charges. In exchange, the prosecutor expected Hill to reveal the identity of his partners in the drug conspiracy, principally Governor Carey. But to the great dismay of the District Attorney, "the big Irishman" was not Governor Carey; rather it was Jimmy Burke. Nonetheless, the District Attorney was compelled to uphold the plea deal with Hill, who dodged the narcotics indictment.

However, despite Hill's escape from prosecution, Burke was not about to chance that his former partner might inform on him. And Burke thought it best to have Hill slated as his next murder victim. Knowing his fate was sealed, Hill decided to enter the Federal Witness Protection Program and help the US Attorney prosecute Lucchese Capo Paul Vario, Jimmy Burke, and other Mafia members. Hill also informed on the three Boston College Basketball players he claimed had participated in the point shaving scheme, and Paul Mazzei.

In the end, save Henry Hill, all the characters attached to the Lufthansa heist were murdered or died in prison. Hill remained in the Witness Protection Program and toured the country lecturing high school students not to lead the lifestyles of outlaws, advocating to assume law abiding lives.

But the largest unrecovered cash robbery and Jimmy Burke's murderous spree was never solved, and to date remain cloaked in mysteries.
