= The Pierre =

Hotel in Manhattan, New York

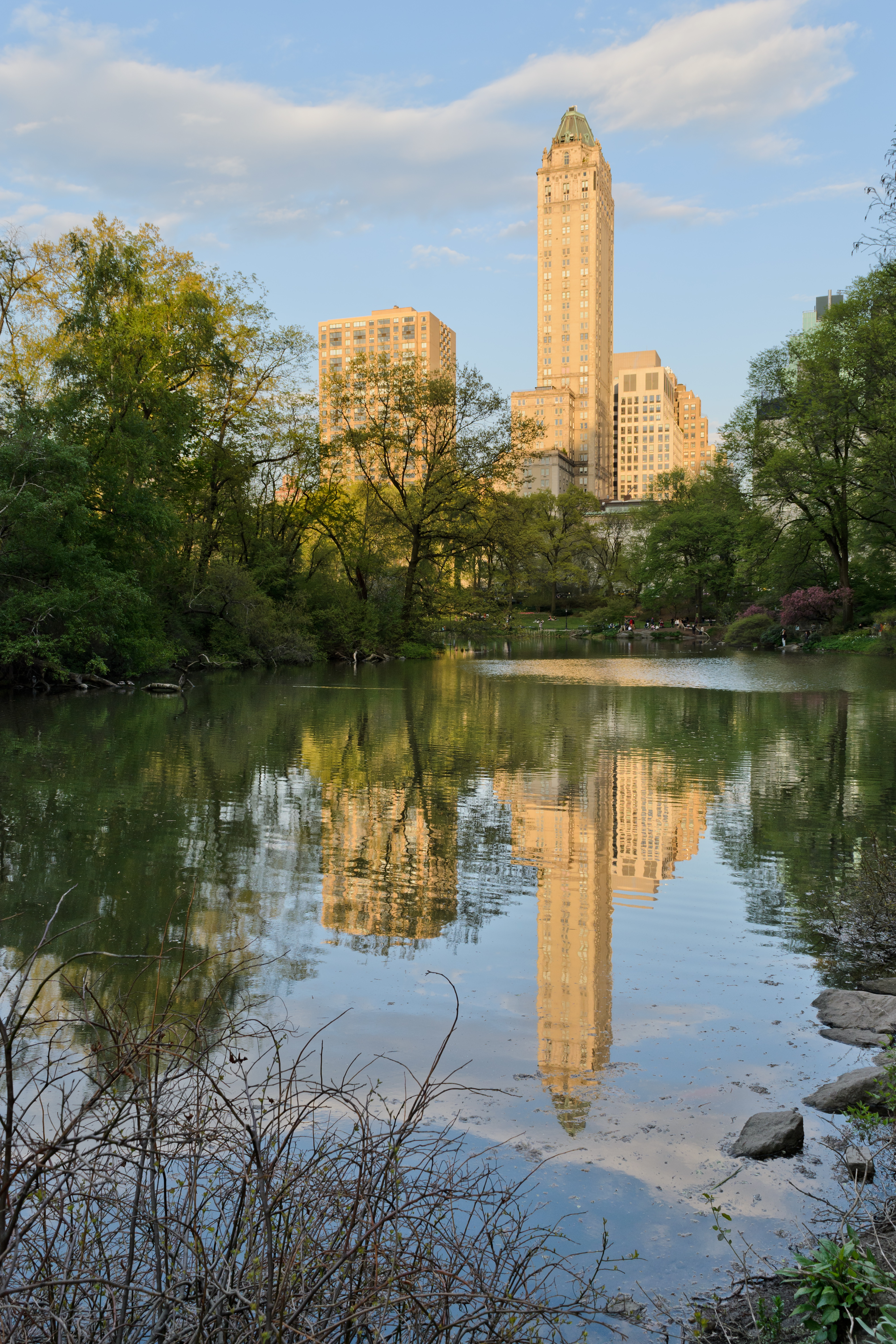
- The Pierre seen from Central Park in 2015
- Interactive map of the The Pierre area

General information
- Location: 2 East 61st Street; Manhattan, New York City
- Coordinates: 40°45′54″N 73°58′18″W
- Opened: 1930
- Owner: Taj Hotels Resorts and Palaces

Height
- Height: 525 feet (160 m)

Technical details
- Floor count: 41

Design and construction
- Architects: Schultze & Weaver

Website
- thepierreny.com

The Pierre is a luxury hotel located at 2 East 61st Street, at the intersection of that street with Fifth Avenue, in Manhattan, New York City, facing Central Park. Designed by Schultze & Weaver, the hotel opened in 1930 with 100+ employees, now with over a thousand. In 2005, the hotel was acquired by Taj Hotels Resorts and Palaces of India. Standing 525 feet (160 m) tall, it is located within the Upper East Side Historic District as designated in 1981 by the New York City Landmarks Preservation Commission.

== History ==
=== Context ===
Charles Pierre Casalasco left his father's restaurant in Ajaccio, Corsica, where he had started as a busboy, (Note: Casalasco and the founding of The Pierre follows the account in (Simon 1978), reported on-line at the City Review.) assumed Charles Pierre as his full professional name, and began work at the Hotel Anglais in Monte Carlo. (Note: Glamorized history reports his father as owner of the Hotel Anglais, and Charles Pierre as rubbing shoulders with the Russian grand dukes and European royalty who patronized his father's hotel.)

Charles Pierre went on to study haute cuisine in Paris, and he later traveled to London where he met the American restaurateur, Louis Sherry, who offered him a position. After Pierre arrived in New York as a 25-year-old immigrant, he made his first mark as first assistant at Sherry's Restaurant and became professionally acquainted with members of the Social Register, as well as newer millionaires like J. P. Morgan and the Vanderbilts. After nine years at Sherry's, Pierre left, first for the Ritz-Carlton on Madison Avenue at 46th Street, then opening his own restaurant on 45th Street immediately west of Fifth Avenue, and finally at Pierre's on Park at 230 Park Avenue.

=== Development and early years ===
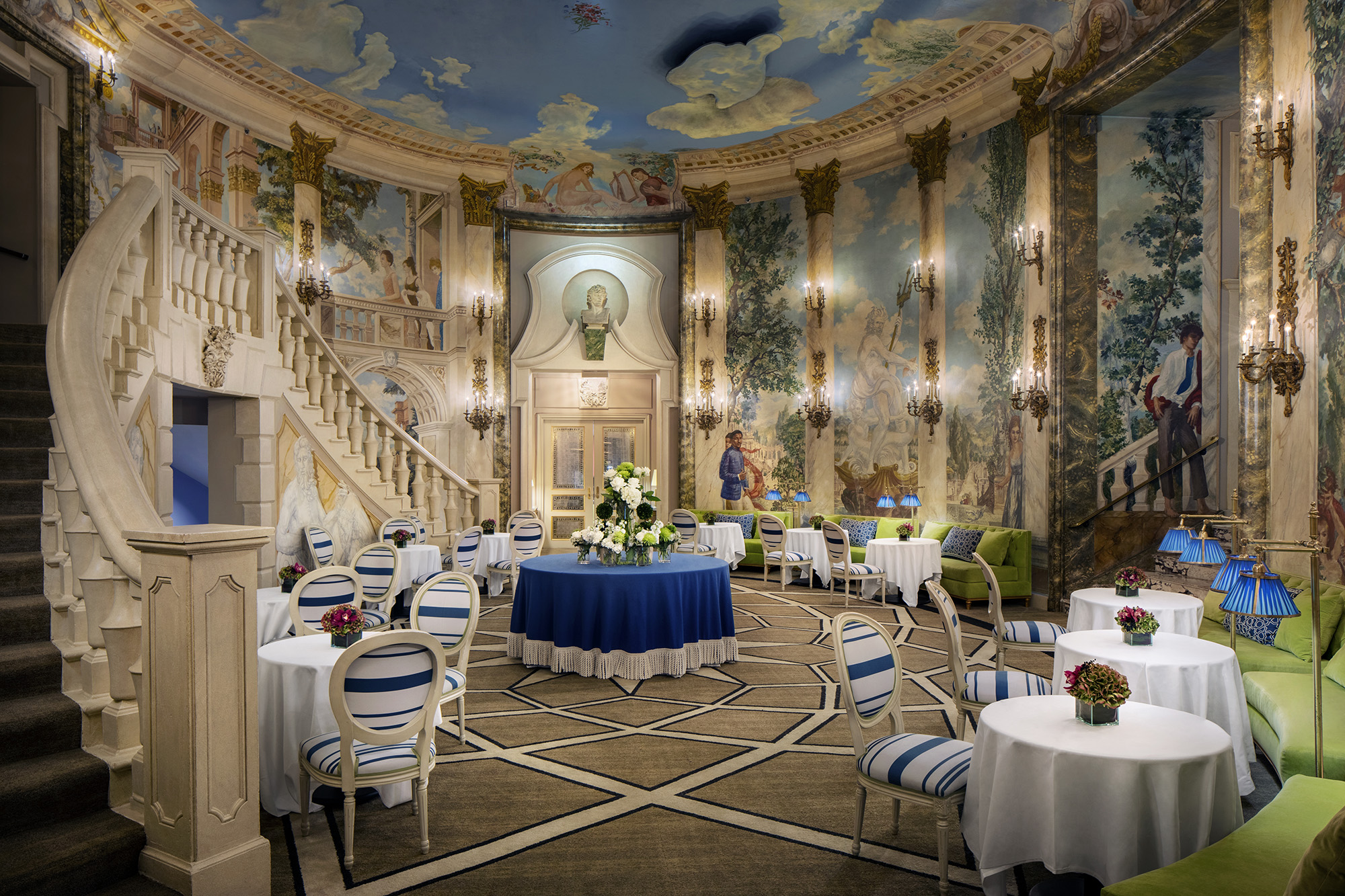
The Rotunda with mural painted by Edward Melcarth

At the height of his success, dissatisfied with the increasing democratization of public manners, Pierre sold his restaurant and entered a joint venture with a group of Wall Street financiers, "among them Otto H. Kahn, Finley J. Shepherd (who had married Helen Gould), Edward F. Hutton, Walter P. Chrysler, and Robert Livingston Gerry, Sr. (the son of Elbridge Thomas Gerry, lawyer, philanthropist and grandson of Elbridge Gerry, the inventor of 'Gerrymandering')".

The 714-room, 41-story hotel that rose 525 feet (160 m) on the site of the Gerry mansion at the corner of Fifth Avenue and 61st Street allowed for unrestricted views of Central Park. It cost $15 million (approximately $220 million in 2024) to build and opened to grand fanfare in October 1930 as The Pierre. The building was designed by the New York firm of Schultze and Weaver as a skyscraper that rises in a blond-brick shaft from a limestone-fronted Louis XVI base. Its topmost floors render it an easily recognizable landmark on the New York skyline; they are modeled after Mansart's Royal Chapel at Versailles, a system of Corinthian pilasters and arch-headed windows, with octagonal ends, under a tall, slanted, copper roof that is pierced with bronze-finished bull's-eye dormers. New York society turned out to attend the gala dinner that marked the opening of The Pierre; it was prepared by Auguste Escoffier, "the father of French chefs", who served as a guest chef at The Pierre in its early years.

As markets continued to collapse during the Great Depression, The Pierre went into bankruptcy in 1932. The oilman, J. Paul Getty, bought it for $2.35 million in 1938 (approximately $41 million in 2024).

=== Mid- and late 20th century ===
Beginning in 1948, New York City's ABC television and FM radio station (then called WJZ-TV Channel 7 and WJZ-FM 95.5, now WABC-TV and WPLJ) broadcast from a tower atop The Pierre, until moving to the Empire State Building a few years later. In 1959, 75 apartments were sold to a cooperative of private residents, while Getty retained control of the hotel's services and guest rooms. Among the permanent residents at The Pierre have been Elizabeth Taylor, Aristotle Onassis, Viacom entertainment-company chairman Sumner Redstone, Mohamed al-Fayed, then the owner of Harrods, and the late designer Yves Saint-Laurent. Thirteen of the apartments have since become "grand suites".

In 1967 and 1968, Edward Melcarth painted a trompe l'oeil mural in the rotunda of the hotel. The mural included mythological characters prominent members of New York's elite like Jacqueline Kennedy and Erik Estrada. After criticism, the hotel painted over the telltale facial details and gave the figures a more generic look.

President-elect Richard M. Nixon stayed at The Pierre for several months in 1968-69 before moving to Washington, D.C.

The Pierre was the scene of the Pierre Hotel robbery in 1972, organized by the Lucchese crime family. This robbery of $27 million would later be listed in the Guinness Book of World Records as the largest, most successful hotel robbery in history. The Pierre came under the management of Four Seasons Hotels and Resorts in 1981.

=== 21st century ===
In 2005, the hotel's 75th anniversary, Taj Hotels Resorts and Palaces, a global chain of fine luxury hotels and resorts, succeeded Four Seasons as the new lessee and operator. In 2010, Taj completed a $100 million top to bottom renovation of the hotel. Taj Hotels is part of India's Tata Group. In 2016, the hotel restored the murals, the decorative plaster ceiling, marble stairs and stone walls. They also added LED strip-lighting runs the perimeter of the floor, shedding up-light onto the murals. The hotel contains 189 guest accommodations, including 49 suites, of which 11 are grand suites. Dining options in the hotel include Perrine restaurant, The Rotunda and Two E Lounge.

In December 2024, the Pierre was placed for sale. Hassanal Bolkiah, the Sultan of Brunei, expressed interest in buying the hotel. Many residents of the hotel opposed the sale, since they could be evicted if the building were sold. Some of these opponents accused the hotel's largest shareholder—U.S. Commerce Secretary Howard Lutnick, who owned the penthouse—of being involved in the idea to sell the building.

== Triplex ==
A 16-room triplex co-op that occupies the top three floors was placed on the market in 2003, with a price tag of $70 million. This 11,000-square-foot (1,000 m^{2}) apartment features five bedrooms, four terraces, a paneled library, a wine cellar, a black Belgian-marble staircase and the hotel's former ballroom with 23-foot (7.0 m) high ceilings. It was originally purchased by the hedge-fund manager Martin Zweig, from publishing heiress Mary Fairfax, in 1999 for $21.5 million. With its $70 million price tag payable in full at purchase, the co-op was listed in 2006 in Forbes magazine as the eighth-most expensive home in the world, fourth-most expensive home in the United States, and second-most expensive home in the Northeastern United States in 2006. It was again put on the market in 2013 at the asking price of $125 million.

The board of directors turned down two would-be buyers. The penthouse returned to the market in March 2013 for an asking price of $125 million. The price was adjusted to $95 million later that year. The triplex, which was refurbished, had its price adjusted down to $57 million in 2016. The triplex was sold to Lutnick for $44 million in 2017.

== In popular culture ==
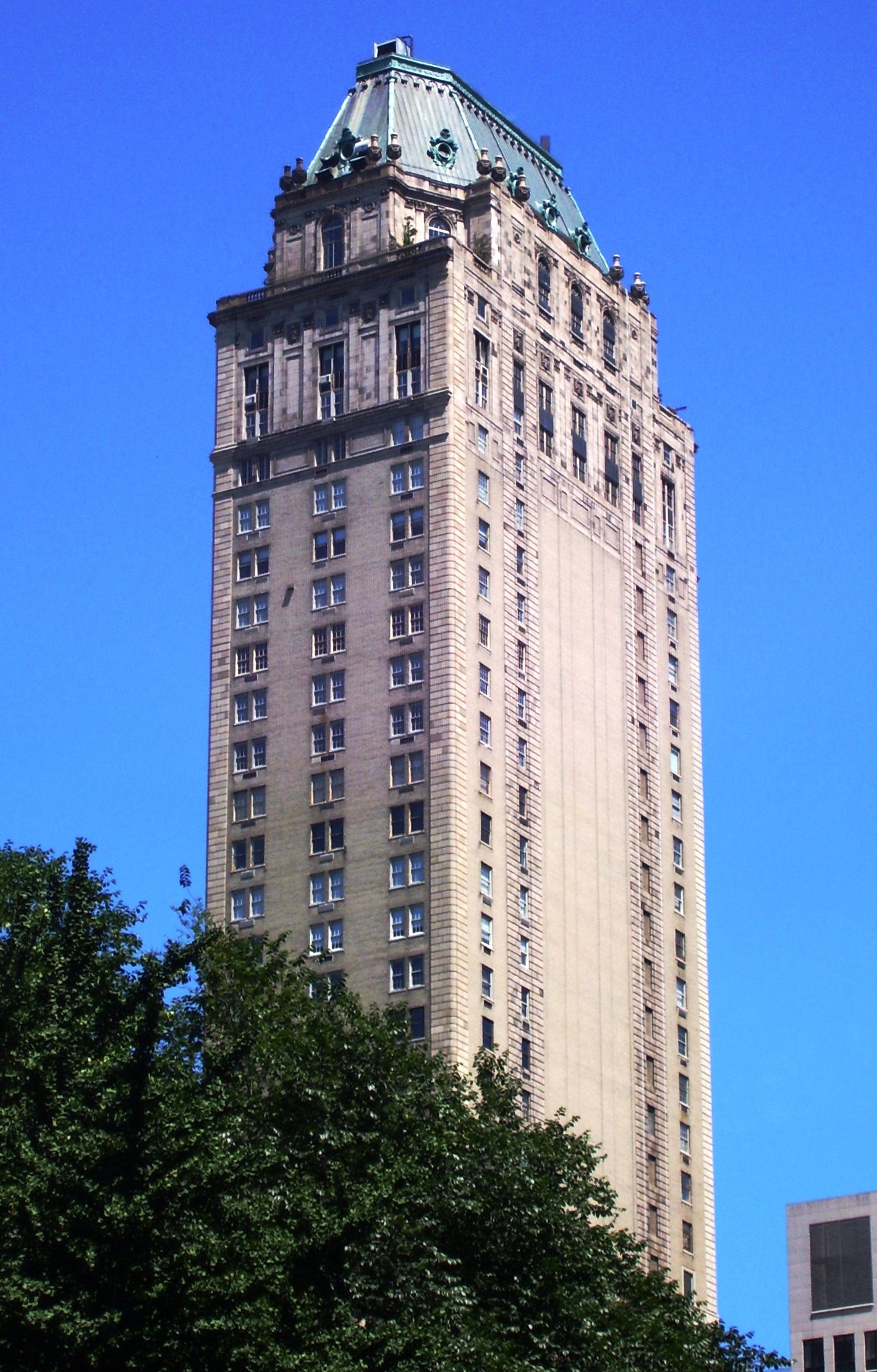
The Pierre rises over Central Park

The Pierre has frequently appeared as a setting in novels, films and in television series.

- 1956: In the novel Seize the Day by Saul Bellow, Dr. Tamkin says he knows a man at the Pierre who orders a case of champagne every day with lunch, by way of illustrating for Tommy the potential income to be obtained from day-trading commodities.
- 1956: In her novel Chocolates for Breakfast, Pamela Moore has the character Anthony Neville living out of a luxury suite at The Pierre, where Courtney and Janet often visit him.
- 1979: The Pierre was referenced in the episode "The Party" of the TV show M*A*S*H, in which the relatives of the main characters get together at the hotel.
- 1990: The driver Marshall, played by Ossie Davis, recommends The Pierre over Plaza Hotel to Joe, played by Tom Hanks, in the film Joe Versus the Volcano.
- 1992: The tango scene with Al Pacino in the film Scent of a Woman was shot in The Pierre's Cotillion Ballroom.
- 1993: The Pierre was the main filming setting for the film For the Love of Money starring Michael J. Fox as the concierge for the fictional Bradbury Hotel.
- 1996: The Pierre again stood in as The Bradbury Hotel for a brief scene in The Associate starring Whoopi Goldberg as an investment adviser.
- 1998: The Pierre's penthouse is the home of Anthony Hopkins' character, William Parrish, in the film Meet Joe Black.
- 2004: In The Sopranos episode "In Camelot", Fran Felstein tells Tony Soprano about her purported meeting and tryst with President John F. Kennedy at a party at The Pierre.
- 2007–2015: The Pierre has appeared or been mentioned in several episodes of Mad Men, and briefly housed the newly formed "Sterling Cooper Draper Pryce" in room 435.
- 2009: In the film Grey Gardens, Edith Bouvier "Little Edie" Beale has her débutante ball on New Year's Day, 1936 at The Pierre, a true story.
- 2009–2010: The Pierre appears several times in episodes of CSI:NY (Season 6, Episode 10: "Death House"; Season 7, Episode 2: "Unfriendly Chat").
- 2010: In Real Housewives of New York City, cast member Ramona Singer had her commitment ceremony at The Pierre.
- 2011: Aerial shots of The Pierre's penthouse exteriors were used as Arthur Bach's apartment in the film Arthur.
- 2015: The Pierre provided the backdrop for the awards ceremony scene in the film Trainwreck, in which the characters of Amy Schumer and Bill Hader argue.
- 2017: The book The Pierre Hotel Affair by Daniel Simone is about the 1972 robbery that took place at The Pierre.
- 2018: In the film Ocean's 8, Anne Hathaway gets ready in The Pierre's Presidential Suite for the Met Gala, and goes on a date in the hotel's Rotunda.
