= William Albert Swasey =

American architect (1863–1940)

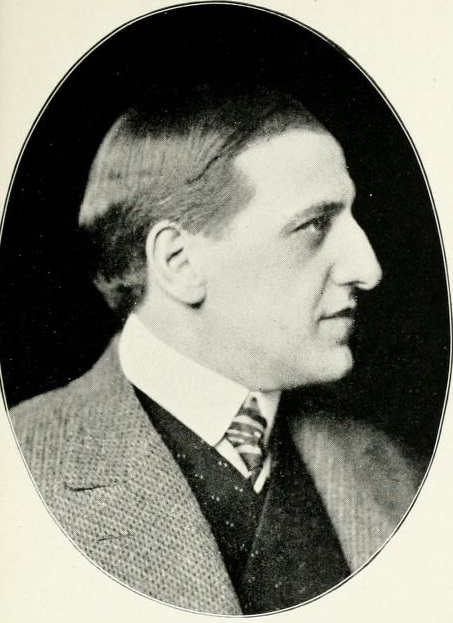
- Born: 11 October 1863; Melbourne, Australia
- Died: 21 March 1940; New York City
- Education: Massachusetts Institute of Technology
- Occupation: Architect

William Albert Swasey (11 October 1863 – 21 March 1940) was an American architect who designed domestic and commercial buildings in St. Louis, Missouri. His work includes theaters for the Shubert family in New York City.

== Early life ==
Although the family normally lived in Boston, Swasey was born in Melbourne, where his parents were temporarily living at the time. His parents were Hattie Hobson Jewett and John Babson Swasey, a successful businessman. His father's firm, J. B. Swasey Commission Company, had offices in Boston, London, and Melbourne.

He was educated at Boston Latin School, followed by a brief stint at a military boarding school in Paris. He then enrolled at the Massachusetts Institute of Technology where he studied architecture, graduating in 1882.

== Career ==
He began working for C. C. Height in New York before moving to Chicago where he worked for the firms of Burnham and Root and Henry Ives Cobb. Swasey moved to St. Louis, Missouri in 1885 and entered into an architectural partnership with Charles K. Ramsey.

Two years later, Swasey opened his own firm. From 1890 he was one of the chief architects of the residential development of Westminster Place and Portland and Westmoreland Places and is credited with introducing the city to Colonial Revival architecture. However, several of the houses he designed for Westmoreland Place, such as the mansion for the banker Jacob Craig Van Blarcom, were in the Italian Renaissance Revival style. Between 1890 and 1904, Swasey's other work included apartment and office buildings in St. Louis and New Orleans; a church in Memphis, Tennessee; and privately commissioned houses in Pennsylvania and Missouri.

In 1904 Swasey received a contract from the developers of Parkview in St. Louis for the design of 20 new houses. However, before the development began, Swasey abruptly cancelled the contract and moved his practice to New York City. Two young associates in his St. Louis practice took it over and implemented some of his designs, all of which were in the Colonial Revival style. Once established in New York, Swasey began designing new theatres or remodelling existing ones for the Shubert family. He also designed the rebuilding of George C. Tillou's Steeplechase Amusement Park at Coney Island in 1907 and the Lido Club Hotel at Lido Beach during the same period.

== Personal life ==
In 1890, Swasey had married Irene McNeal of Memphis Tennessee. She was the daughter of Albert McNeal, a prominent jurist. The couple had one son, McNeal Swasey (1891–1946) who also became an architect with a career largely based in California. The couple later divorced. Swasey remarried in 1914 to Eleanor Hinton.

With the Great Depression, new commissions dried up and Swasey found himself in financial difficulty. An article in the New York Times of 6 December 1932 recounted how Swasey had fallen seriously in arrears with the alimony payments to his ex-wife, Irene McNeal Swasey. He claimed that he and his family were living on less than $1 a day. Nevertheless, the court ordered his property to be sequestered to pay the back alimony. His collection of architectural books was sold at an auction in 1932, and many of his designs and records from his time in New York were lost in his frequent changes of residence during the Depression.

Swasey spent part of his later years in Florida where he designed a few houses in the Spanish Colonial style. He died of cancer at the Calvary Hospital in New York City in 1940 at age 86. He was survived by his second wife, Eleanor, and his sons, McNeal Swasey from his first marriage, and Albert Swasey from his second. He was buried in Ferncliff Cemetery.

== Projects ==
=== Domestic architecture in St. Louis ===
Swasey designed fourteen houses for Joseph Scott Fullerton's real estate development in Westminster Place, including his own Colonial Revival-style residence at 4384 Westminster Place. He also designed the ornamental gates to the development. For Fullerton's development of Portland and Westmoreland Places and their adjoining streets he designed a further six houses, including a mansion on Lindell Boulevard for the industrialist James Green, another mansion on Lindell for Judge Wilbur Boyle and another at 13 Portland Place for William K. Bixby.

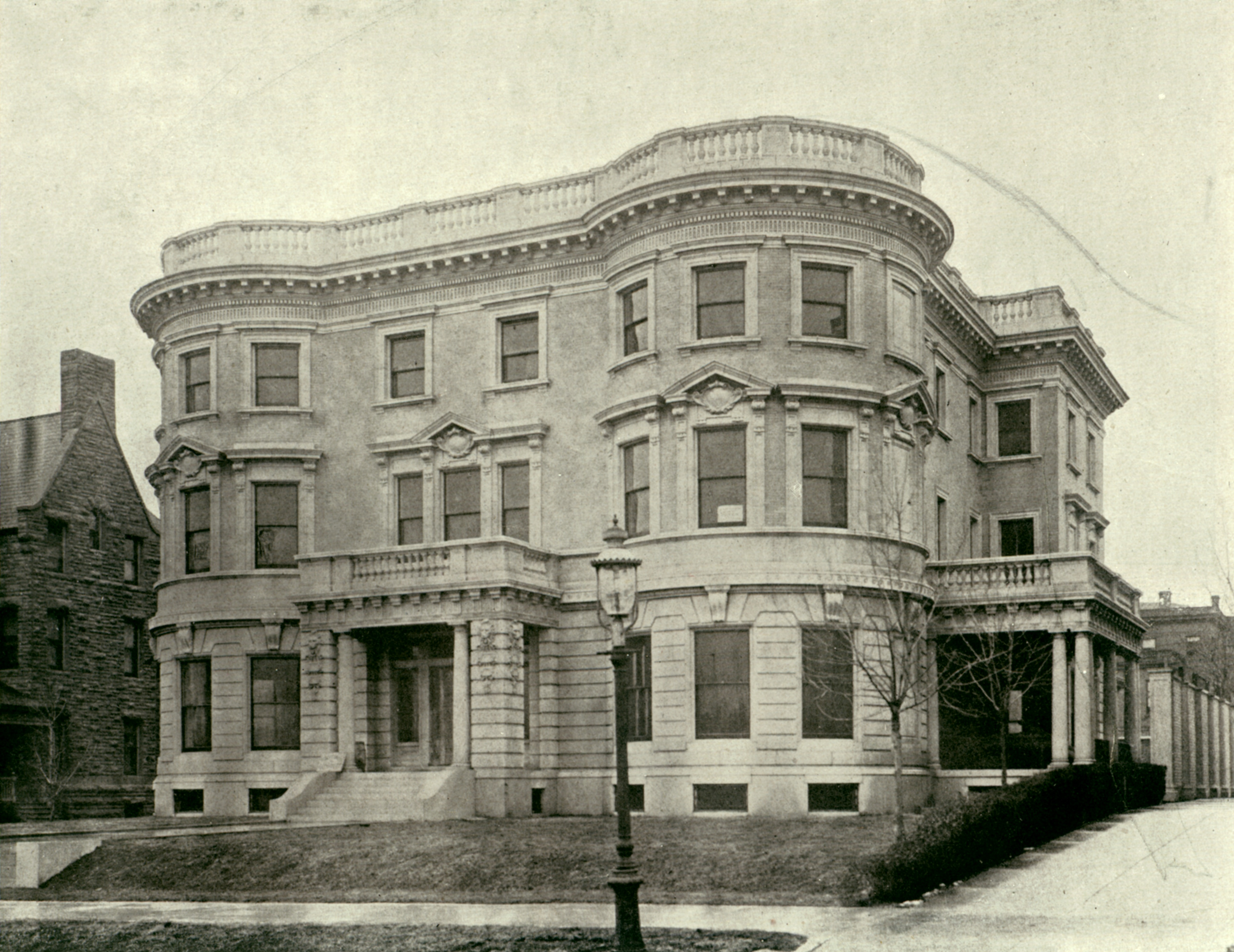
James Green Residence

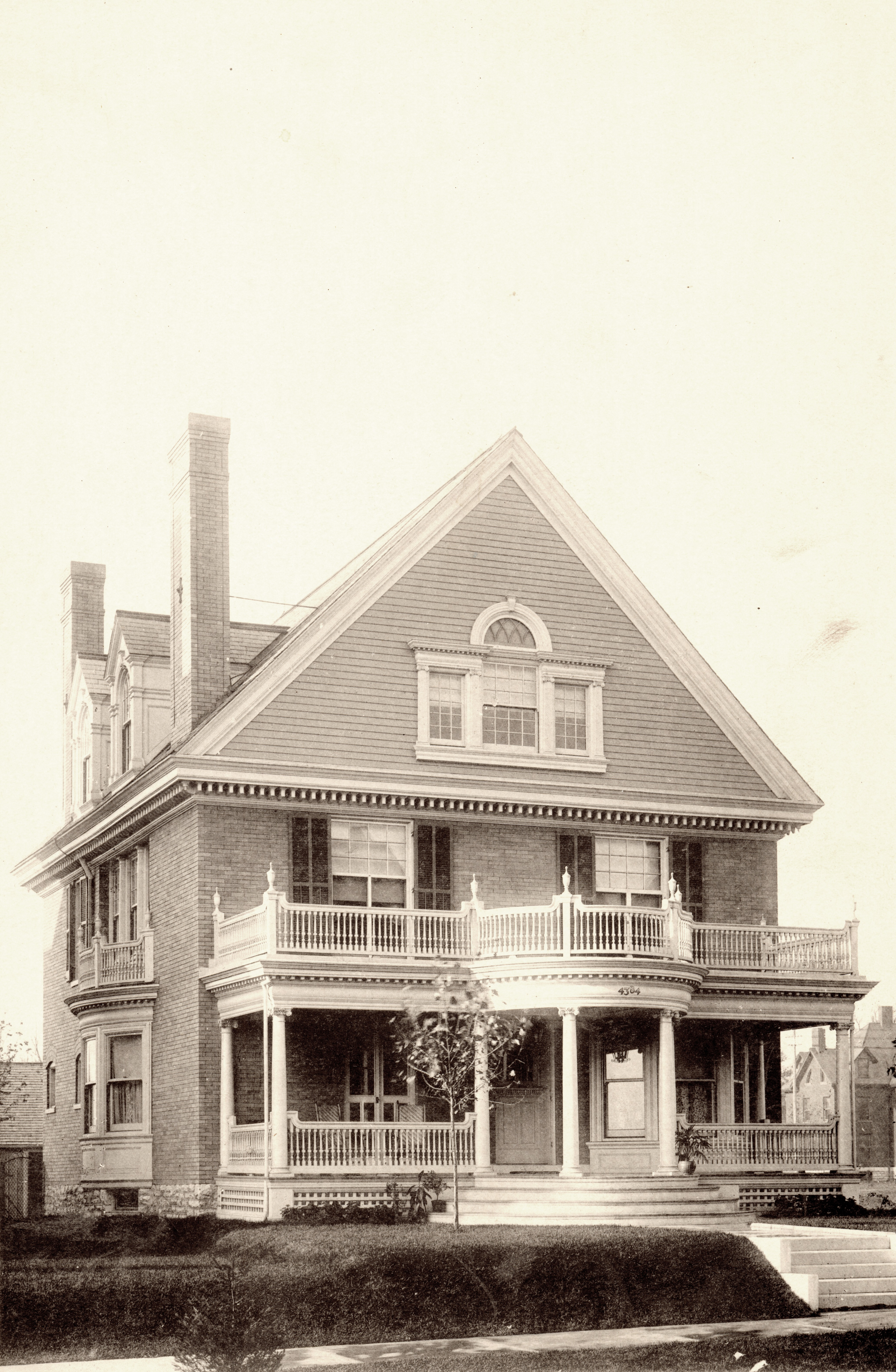
William A. Swasey Residence

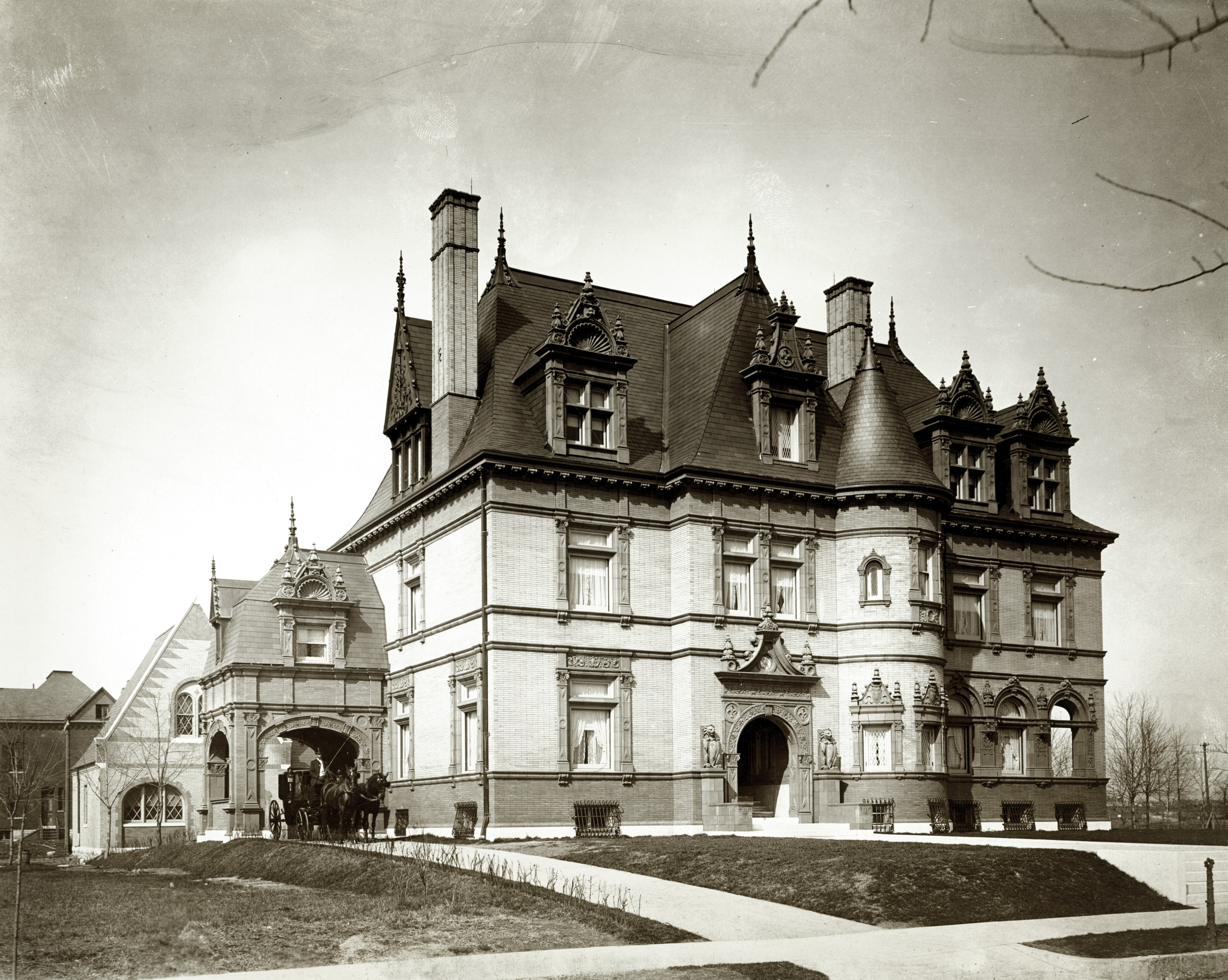
William K. Bixby Residence

=== Theatres ===
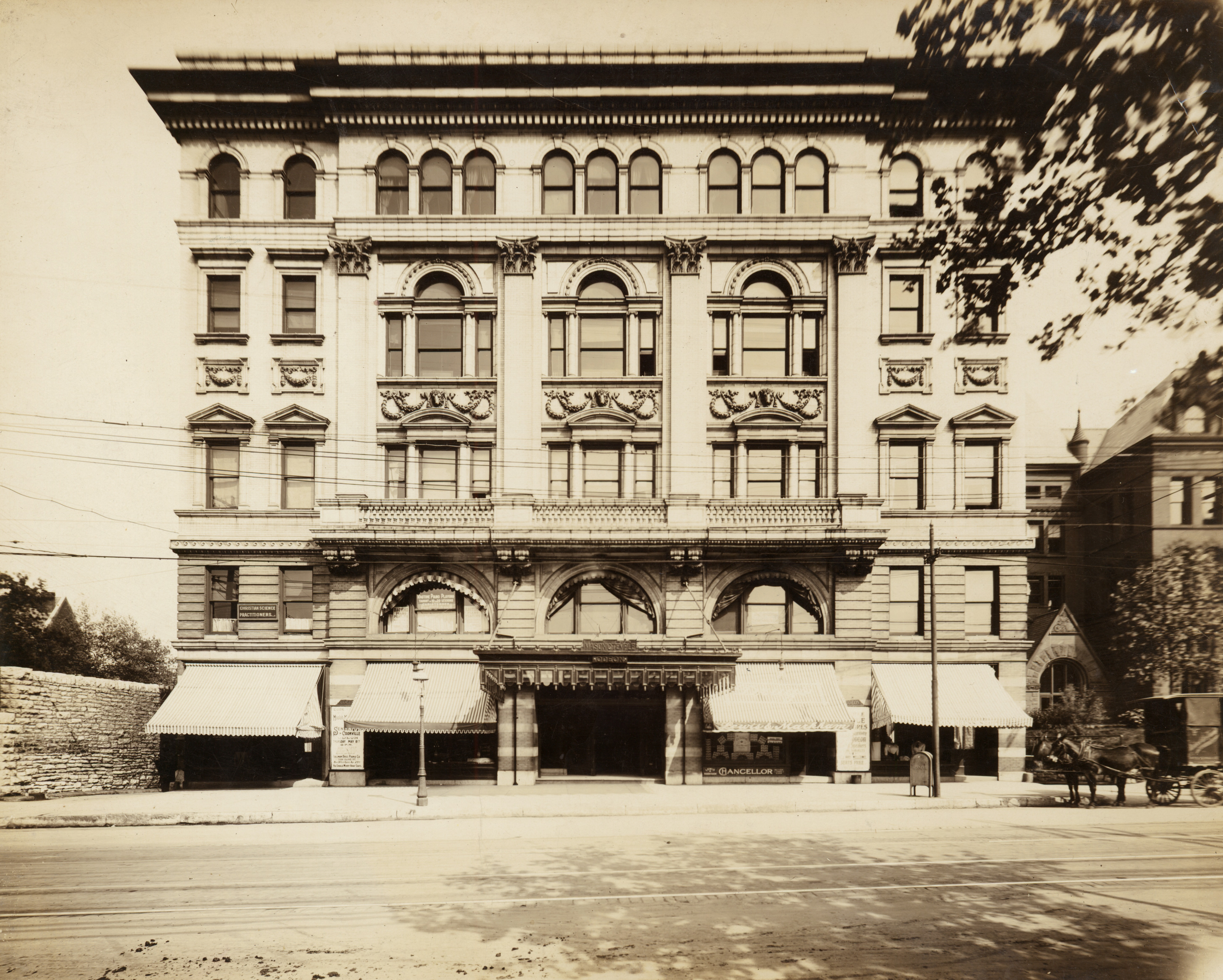
Odeon Theatre and Masonic Temple in St. Louis

Swasey's first forays into theatre design were in St. Louis where he designed the Odeon Theatre and Masonic Temple in 1899 and the Garrick Theatre in 1904. The Odeon was for many years the home of the St. Louis Symphony Orchestra. It was demolished in 1935 after a series of fires. The Garrick Theatre was built by the Shubert family to take advantage of the influx of people to the city for the St. Louis World's Fair. It opened in December 1904 with Ada Rehan and Charles Richman in The Taming of the Shrew. The Garrick functioned as a playhouse until after World War I when it was bought by Loews Theatres and converted to a burlesque house. After World War II, it became a cinema showing adult films. It was finally closed and demolished in 1954.

Later theatres designed by Swasey include:

- Sam S. Shubert Theater (Minneapolis, built 1910)
- 39th Street Theatre (New York City, built 1910, demolished 1925)
- Winter Garden Theatre (New York City, built 1911)
- Shubert Theatre (New Haven, built 1914)
- 44th Street Theatre (New York City, built 1912, demolished 1945)
- 48th Street Theatre (New York City, built 1912, demolished 1955)
- New Broad Street Theatre (Philadelphia, built 1913, demolished 1971)
