= Herbert B. Ehrmann =

American lawyer (1891–1970)

Herbert B. Ehrmann (HBE) (December 15, 1891 – June 17, 1970) was an American lawyer, activist, and writer. He gained fame for authoring books on the famous Sacco and Vanzetti case, and he was the author of the play Under This Roof which was staged on Broadway in 1942 at the Windsor Theatre by producer Rita Hassan.

== Life and career ==
Ehrmann was born in Louisville, Kentucky in 1891, graduated from Harvard College in 1912 and got his law degree from Harvard University Law School.

In October, 1914, Ehrmanm joined the Boston Legal Aid Society.

During World War I, Ehrmann was the director of the industrial relations division of the United States Shipping Board and a member of the War Labor Policies Board.

Ehrmann was active in Jewish human rights and civic affairs and in Jewish organizational life. He was a trustee of the Combined Jewish Appeal, honorary trustee of the Associated Jewish Philanthropies in Boston, honorary president of the American Jewish Committee in April 1959 and has served in that capacity until 1961. He began his activism already as student at Harvard.

In 1957 Ehrmann was a member of a Fact‐Finding Group, a nine-man delegation, conducting a 15,000-mile fact-finding survey meeting government leaders in France, Italy, Tunisia, and Morocco, and Israel. The delegation was granted a special audience with Pope Pius XII.

Ehrmann was president of the Hale House Association in Boston.(1934-1937) He served on the Massachusetts Judicial Council and the Massachusetts Civil Service Commission.

After the trial of Italian immigrants Sacco and Vanzetti, Ehrmann wrote two books about the case: The Untried Case and The Case That Will Not Die—Commonwealth vs. Sacco and Vanzetti - the book for which in 1969 he won the Edgar Award for the best fact crime book of the year. In addition, Ehrmann wrote articles. Ehrmann also wrote the book, and play, Under this Roof. It appeared at Windsor theatre in 1942.

Ehrmann translated poetry from Hebrew into English.

Herbert's wife, Sara R. Ehrmann (1895–1993) was a Boston-area civic leader. She is best known for her work as an avid opponent of capital punishment. A career she began when Herbert became an associate counsel for Sacco and Vanzet in 1925.
