= Daniel Simone =

American author

Daniel Simone (born in New York City) is an American author, who specialized in writing about sensational crimes in collaboration with one of the perpetrators or investigators of the actual event.

== The Lufthansa Heist ==
Daniel Simone co-wrote The Lufthansa Heist with Henry Hill. Hill's life and criminal career is portrayed in Martin Scorsese's film Goodfellas. Simone also had the collaboration of the two FBI agents who led the investigation of the robbery. These two investigators declared their testimonials to Hill and Simone's account in the book's Foreword and Afterward, which were written by them. Additionally, Simone relied on numerous other sources such as the former US Attorney in charge of the Lufthansa case, Port Authority of New York and New Jersey officials, a former NYPD detective, and an ex Long Island Nassau County Assistant District Attorney. Simone interviewed several alleged Mafia gangsters who came forth with their knowledge related to the plotting of the Lufthansa robbery. Simone also used court records during the production of the manuscript. Refer to the Author's Notes and Sources in The Lufthansa Heist by Daniel Simone & Henry Hill.

In this book, Daniel Simone also describes a full account of the 1978 infamous Boston College Basketball Point Shaving Scheme engineered by Henry Hill. The fixing of the Boston Eagles games stands as one of the most widely known sports scandals in American history. Hill recruited three Eagles players to manipulate the scoring so that it would end over or under the point spread odds set by the Las Vegas bookmakers. Also refer to pages 76–86 in The Lufthansa Heist by Daniel Simone & Henry Hill.

The Lufthansa Heist is a dramatic rendition of the robbery, unveiling facts and comprehensive details that Henry Hill had not publicized in the past.

== The Charles Manson Project ==
In early 2015, Simone and a collaborator, Heidi Jordan Ley, completed a manuscript about the Charles Manson murder convictions titled The Retrial of Charles Manson. This is the first book, according to the author, endorsed and corroborated by Manson. Simone and Ley re-investigate and discredit the Helter Skelter theory put forth by Manson's prosecutor, Vincent Bugliosi, as the motivation of the Sharon Tate and her friends' murders. Furthermore, this version of the Charles Manson affair outlines Bugliosi's arrest for fabrication of evidence and perjury during the Manson trial. Among those charges he was also indicted for leaking non-public court documents to a reporter.

The manuscript was adapted to a documentary series titled, Charles Manson: The Final Words. It premiered on the REELZ Channel on December 6, 2017.

== Pierre Hotel Robbery ==
Simone's 2015 book The Pierre Hotel Affair is published by Pegasus. This project is about the 1972 famed Pierre Hotel Robbery when eight armed robbers, with extraordinary politeness and civility, placed the entire complex under siege, captured its employees and anyone who happened to have been in the lobby area, and ransacked the guests' safe deposit boxes, escaping with $28,000,000 in jewels, cash, and bearer bonds. (Refer to The Man Who Robbed the Pierre by Ira Berkow). The sole surviving perpetrator, Nick 'the Cat' Sacco, who is currently in the Federal Witness Protection Program for an unrelated crime, has collaborated with Simone in developing the book, revealing never-before-told facts and revelations. (See also April 19, 2016 issue Page 12 of New York Post). (See additional citation on May 5, 2016, Page 34 issue of Dan's Papers. This weekly print magazine is based in Southampton, New York and has no connection with Daniel Simone).

Many of the victims, who refused to cooperate with the authorities, were of high-society stock. The Pierre Hotel, located in mid-Manhattan, is rated as one of the most luxurious in the world, hosting celebrities, affluent personages, and high ranking statesmen. Furthermore, The Pierre Hotel Affair sets forth and reconstructs how fourteen months prior to the caper, two of the gunmen, Robert Bobby Comfort and Sammy the Arab Nalo, held captive and robbed the Italian actress, Sophia Loren. Comfort and Nalo relieved her of approximately $520,000 in jewelry. (Refer to New York Magazine April 30, 1973 issue page 46).

In the end, much to the frustration of the investigators, the stolen items from the Loren and the Pierre robberies were never recovered.

== Published feature articles ==
Simone has published approximately 130 feature stories in several print publications. In 2009, he created Between the Lines, a monthly column published in LI Pulse magazine, a print publication with a certified circulation of 100,000. In the Between the Lines series, Simone presents his interviews with celebrity authors and his reviews of their latest titles.

== Celebrity correspondent editor ==
From 2006 through 2013, serving as a celebrity correspondent, Simone has published in various print media an array of his interviews with celebrity actors and authors.

== Television & Radio appearances ==
From time to time, Simone has been on television programs discussing his current literary projects or as a highlight commentator in documentaries of renowned crimes and reputed gangsters. In 2012, Simone appeared in a documentary series produced and broadcast by the Biography Channel, titled Mobsters, wherein he contributed particulars about the felonious life of Jimmy ''the Gent'' Burke and his masterminding of the Lufthansa robbery. In 2015, he was cast in an indie film, titled The Assault. He played the part of a professional gambler, Al Visconti, who was secretly gambling on behalf of the New York Lucchese Crime Family. In 2017, Simone Appeared in another film titled, Room 7. In that movie he is portrayed as the Author. On May 21, 2017, the REELZ Channel launched a documentary series titled, The Shocking Truth, and Daniel Simone appeared in the first episode titled, Goodfellas. (Refer to REELZ TV Schedule) He is often interviewed on nationally syndicated radio talk shows, discussing a variety of topics surrounding famous capers, Mafia personalities, and their impact on society. He also delves into the questionable effectiveness of the judicial system pertaining to Mafia associates. On February 21, 2016, and May 28, 2017, Mr. Simone has been a guest on journalist George Knapp's syndicated Coast to Coast radio show.

Simone has appeared also on the ED Bernstein TV Show in Las Vegas, Nevada.

== Early life ==
In his earlier years, Simone received a degree in Aerospace and Aerodynamics engineering from Farmingdale State University in Long Island, N.Y.

In 1972, he was employed at Grumman Aerospace Industries and contributed to the assembly of the later versions of the Apollo lunar modules that landed on the moon surface. He operated an Electron Beam Welding machine, which was then an innovative method of fusing two metals with dissimilar properties.

He later majored in English literature at Long Island University in Brooklyn, N.Y. In 1980, he enrolled in law courses at St. John's University in Queens, New York.
