= Under This Roof =

Under This Roof is a 1940 play in 2 Acts and 7 scenes by Boston lawyer, activist and writer Herbert B. Ehrmann, who had earlier achieved fame as the defense attorney in the Sacco and Vanzetti trial in 1920. Set inside an old New England household outside of Boston, the play is a historical drama revolving around the lives of three generations of a single American family from 1864 to 1917. The central character is Cornelia Thayer who marries the wealthy and snobbish Boston financier Ezra Warren after rejecting a proposal from his brother Gibeon Warren; a man leaving to seek his fortune as a pioneer in the Western United States. The play had its world premiere at the Red Barn Theatre in Westboro, Massachusetts on July 23, 1940 with a cast that included Alice Wiley as Cornelia Warren (nee Thayer), Wendell Corey as Ezra Warren, Michael St. Angel as Gibeon Warren, Helen Walker as Eileen O'Shaughnessy, John Taylor as Senator Flower, and Conway Washburn as Mr. Gassaway.

The play was staged on Broadway at the Windsor Theatre; opening for performances on February 22, 1942 and closing the following March 7 after 17 performances. This production was produced by Russel Lewis and Rita Hassan, and directed by Russel Lewis. Scenic designs were done by Perry Watkins, the first African-American to design a Broadway show (working earlier in the Mamba's Daughters). The cast was led by Barbara O'Neil, the actress who portrayed Scarlett O'Hara's mother in Gone With The Wind, in the role of Cornelia Warren. Other cast members included Russell Hardie as Ezra Warren, Peter Hobbs as Gibeon Warren, John Draper as David Warren, George L. Spaulding as Abner Warren, Harlan Briggs as Mr. Gassaway, Watson White as Senator Flower, Howard St. John as Horace Drury, Walter Burke as Shawn O'Shaughnessy, and Louise Galloway as Granny Warren.
