= Pierre Hotel robbery =

1972 robbery

Coordinates: 40.7652°N 73.9721°W

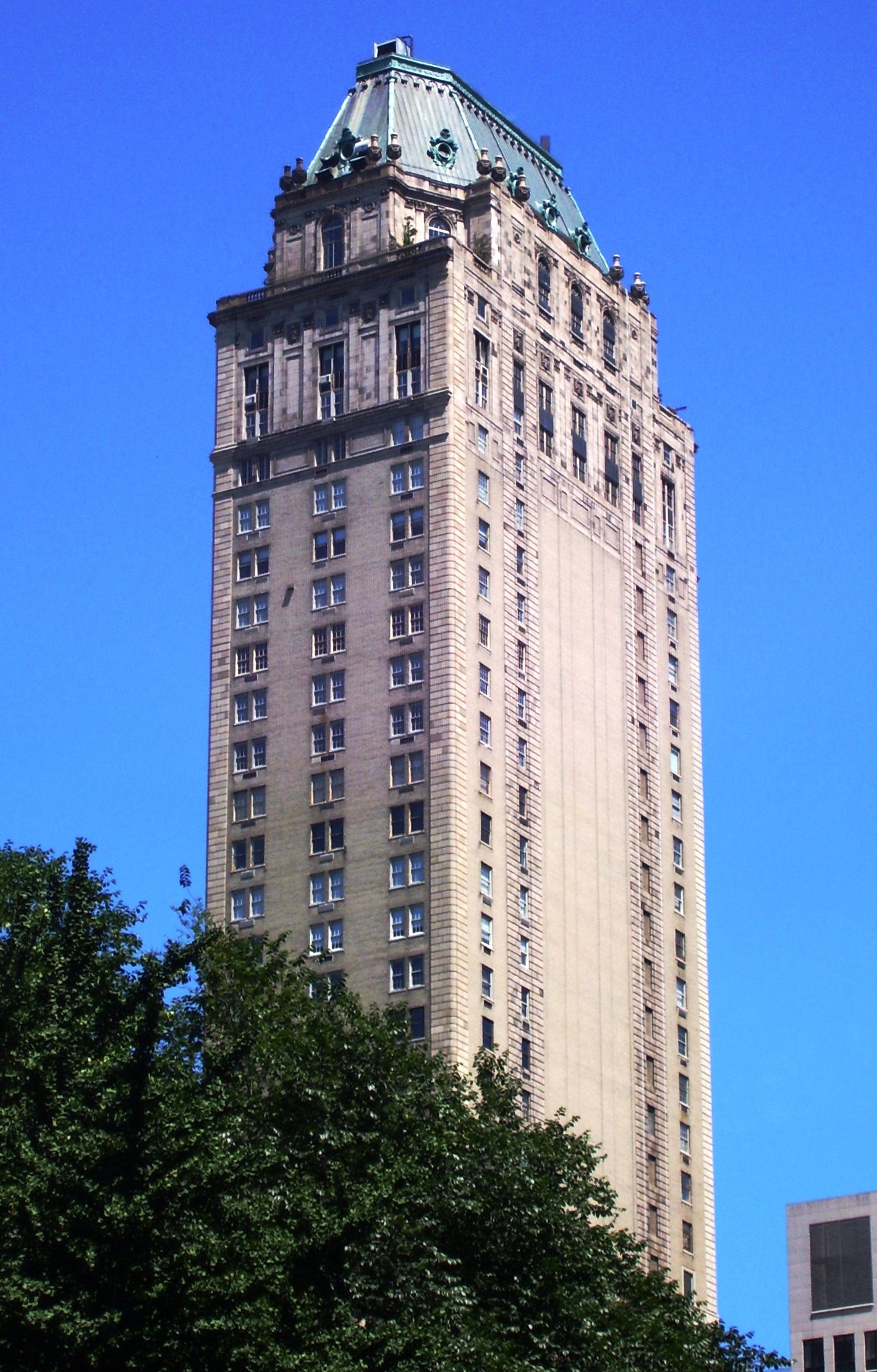
- Date: January 2, 1972
- Location: The Pierre in Manhattan, New York City, New York, U.S.
- Type: Robbery of $3 million dollars

The Pierre hotel robbery was a January 2, 1972 robbery at The Pierre Hotel in New York City. The robbery netted $3 million (worth $27 million today), and was organized by Samuel Nalo; Robert "Bobby" Comfort, an associate of the Rochester Crime Family; and Christie "the Tic" Furnari, an associate of the Lucchese Crime Family. The heist was carried out by several of Furnari's gang burglars. This robbery would later be listed in the Guinness Book of World Records as the largest, most successful hotel robbery in history.

== Planning and execution ==
Samuel Nalo and Robert Comfort were professional burglars and thieves. They had previously stolen $1,000,000 in jewelry and cash from Sophia Loren’s suite in the Sherry Netherland Hotel and performed major robberies/burglaries at the Regency Hotel, the Drake Hotel, the Carlyle Hotel, and the St. Regis. Nalo was the main planner behind all the heists but Comfort was also a major organizer. It was not until December 30 in the back room of Nalo's night club, the Port Said, that Nalo brought the team together and informed them of their intended target. The team consisted of Lucchese crime family associate Robert "Bobby" Germaine, whose job would consist of prying open lock boxes maintained for guests in an open vault; Ali-Ben, a contract killer who worked primarily for the Albanian Mafia; and Al Green, the brother-in-law of Ali Ben.

This group arrived at The Pierre at 3:50 a.m. on January 2, 1972. Ten minutes later, Green, dressed in a chauffeur's uniform, drove a black Cadillac limousine up to the hotel's 61st Street entrance. Robert G, got out and told the security guard, "Reservations, Dr. Foster's party." The security guard called the registration desk and confirmed that a Dr. Foster—Comfort's alias—had paid for a room, and the guard unlocked the door. They held the guard at gunpoint as they entered the hotel. Green remained on watch outside.

The date of the robbery was perfect. Most of the hotel's guests were soundly sleeping off their escapades from the previous New Year's Eve extravaganzas, which they had attended wearing their finest jewels. The jewels were kept in safety deposit boxes downstairs until more secure bank vaults re-opened at 9:00 that morning. Also, because of the holiday, the hotel had only a skeleton crew, including guards.

The men quickly rounded up all the staff. Frankos guarded the 61st Street entrance, handcuffing anyone who confronted him and leading them to Visconti, who brought the hostages to a large alcove near the registration desk, where he ordered them to lie face down on the floor. The number of hostages grew steadily, ultimately totaling nineteen, but the robbers had brought three dozen pairs of handcuffs to deal with the situation.

The robbers were all dressed in disguises. Nalo wore a huge wig, fake nose, and eyeglasses, and all the burglars wore gloves and carried guns. Nalo forced the hotel auditor to provide the index cards that matched the boxes to depositors. They only broke into lock boxes of people whose names they recognized, which included Harold Uris, Tom Yawkey, and Calliope Kulukundis. The burglars did not handcuff anyone who looked ill or sick, and referred to their hostages as "sir" and "miss", never raising their voices.

The entire robbery took two and a half hours. Within that time Bobby G and Comfort were able to break into close to one quarter of the 208 lock boxes in the vault. At 6:15, Bobby Comfort informed the hostages that they were leaving and to not tell the police if they were able to identify anyone or they would be murdered. Before departing, Comfort gave a $20 bill to each hotel employee that they had detained, except for the security guards, and they all left at 6:30, just ahead of the hotel's incoming 7:00 a.m. shift.

== Fencing the goods ==
Nalo went to a Lucchese Family consigliere, Christie 'the Tick' Furnari, to fence the stolen goods. Furnari demanded an outrageous 33% of the take. Nalo became so enraged that he transported the bulk of it to a friend's house in Detroit, Michigan. Robert Comfort returned from Rochester, New York where he lived, to help Nalo fence the jewels. Sammy owed a lot of money to illegal bookmakers who were threatening his life. The police were notified of his whereabouts by an informant and he was arrested at the Royal Manhattan Hotel.

== Arrests and convictions ==
Nalo was also arrested for his alleged participation in the robbery and the two burglars each received four-year sentences. Shortly after the arrests of Comfort and Nalo, Nalo's friend in Michigan became nervous and turned over $750,000 in jewels to police. Millions more in currency and jewels were taken by another friend of Nalo's who absconded to Mexico and was never heard of again.

== Aftermath ==
Ali-Ben and his brother-in-law, Al Green, read in the newspaper about the stolen property recovered in Michigan and perceived that Nalo had tried to swindle them out of their share. They fled the country to somewhere in Europe, where they cherished their wealth for several years. Robert Comfort then fenced the jewellery to mobsters in the Rochester, New York Mafia. The mobsters kept the loot and when Comfort attempted to retrieve some of it, they nearly murdered him. Donald Frankos was supposed to receive $750,000, and was enraged that all he initially received was $50,000. Over time, Donald was given a total of $175,000, the same with Bobby G and Al Visconti. Sacco received about $2,000,000. Ali-Ben and Al Green spent most of their money in Europe. Robert Comfort ended up with $1.5 million and Samuel Nalo received his jewels that his friends had not stolen.

== Retribution ==
Donald Frankos chiefly blamed Nalo for the rip-off and vowed to murder him. Samuel Nalo was subsequently murdered by an unknown gunman in 1988, but not by Frankos. He was also angry at his co-conspirators, Ali-Ben and Al Green, but Frankos knew that they too had been cheated by Nalo. Frankos also surmised that Robert Comfort had been muscled out of his share and gladly left with his life. Frankos would later murder both Ali-Ben and Al Green in 1981.

The only survivor from the cast of the heist at The Pierre is Nick "The Cat" Sacco, who is currently in the Federal Witness Protection Program for an unrelated matter. Sacco collaborated with writer, Daniel Simone, on a novel about the Pierre Robbery, The Pierre Hotel Affair.

== See also ==
- List of large value US robberies
