= Sara R. Ehrmann =

Bostonian civic leader (1895–1993)

Sara Rosenfeld Ehrmann
- Ehrmann c. 1953
- Born: Sara Emilie Rosenfeld; June 14, 1895; Bowling Green, Kentucky, U.S.
- Died: March 18, 1993 (aged 97); Brookline, Massachusetts, U.S.
- Education: University of Rochester (1918)
- Spouse: Herbert B. Ehrmann (m. 1917; died 1970)

Sara Rosenfeld Ehrmann (born Sara Emilie Rosenfeld, June 14, 1895 – March 18, 1993) was a Boston civic leader who fought against capital punishment both city and nationwide. Best known for her work establishing the 1951 "Mercy Law" in Massachusetts, which allowed juries to opt out of the death penalty on first-degree murder cases, Ehrmann was an influential leader of the Massachusetts Council for the Abolition of the Death Penalty (1928–1969) and the American League to Abolish Capital Punishment (1949–1969). She launched her career as a direct response to the internationally controversial Sacco and Vanzetti case, which her husband worked on as an assistant defense councilman.

Ehrmann's activism spread to other areas; she was a national membership chairman of the American Jewish Committee, the first president of the League of Women Voters, and a member of the United Prison Association and the Friends of Framingham Reformatory.

== Early years ==
Ehrmann was born in Bowling Green, Kentucky, the daughter of Helen Emelie Rosenfeld and businessman Abe Rosenfeld.

In 1917 she married Herbert B. Ehrmann, an attorney and founder of the Greater Boston Chapter of the American Jewish Committee. He was an assistant defense councilman for the Sacco and Vanzetti trial, and both he and his wife were very active in civic affairs and the Jewish community.

In 1918 she received her bachelor's degree from the University of Rochester while taking additional courses at Smith College. She gave birth to their first son, Hilmar Bruce Ehrmann, in 1918; and their second, Robert Lincoln Ehrmann, in 1922.

== Life and career ==
From 1927 to 1967, Ehrmann led the fight against the death penalty in Massachusetts, and had her first major victory in 1951. Under her leadership, Massachusetts law was changed to allow members of the jury to vote for life imprisonment instead of execution on convictions for first-degree murder. Until then, the death penalty mandatory, so this ruling was called the Mercy Law. It was Ehrmann's "foot in the door" toward absolute reform.

In an interview with The Boston Globe, Ehrmann said:

I had a firm conviction that it is unnecessary and wrong to take lives in punishment for crime. It is a great source of evil in the community.

In 1972, the death penalty was abolished due to a Supreme Court ruling. However, just four years later, the same ruling was altered so that capital punishment was allowed if certain protective measures were considered.

It wasn't until 1980 that the ruling was again reviewed and overturned by the Massachusetts Supreme Judicial Court as both unconstitutional and "impermissible in the commonwealth".

== Death ==
Ehrmann lived in Brookline until her death of natural causes, at age 97, on March 18, 1993. Her body rests in Temple Israel Cemetery in Wakefield, Massachusetts.

== Legacy and influence ==
As a leading figure on the Massachusetts Council for the Abolition of the Death Penalty, Ehrmann continuously made the efforts of the organization public, and personally appealed to Massachusetts governors and councillors. Due to her tireless efforts, Massachusetts' last execution occurred in 1947.

Ehrmann said in an interview with The Boston Globe:

To every possible question that I've asked myself to justify the death penalty, I've never found a satisfactory answer.

In 1967, Ehrmann retired as the Council's president, but stayed on as a member of its board. It was her hope that more young and capable abolitionists would take her place and continue her efforts.
