= Forbes Galleries =

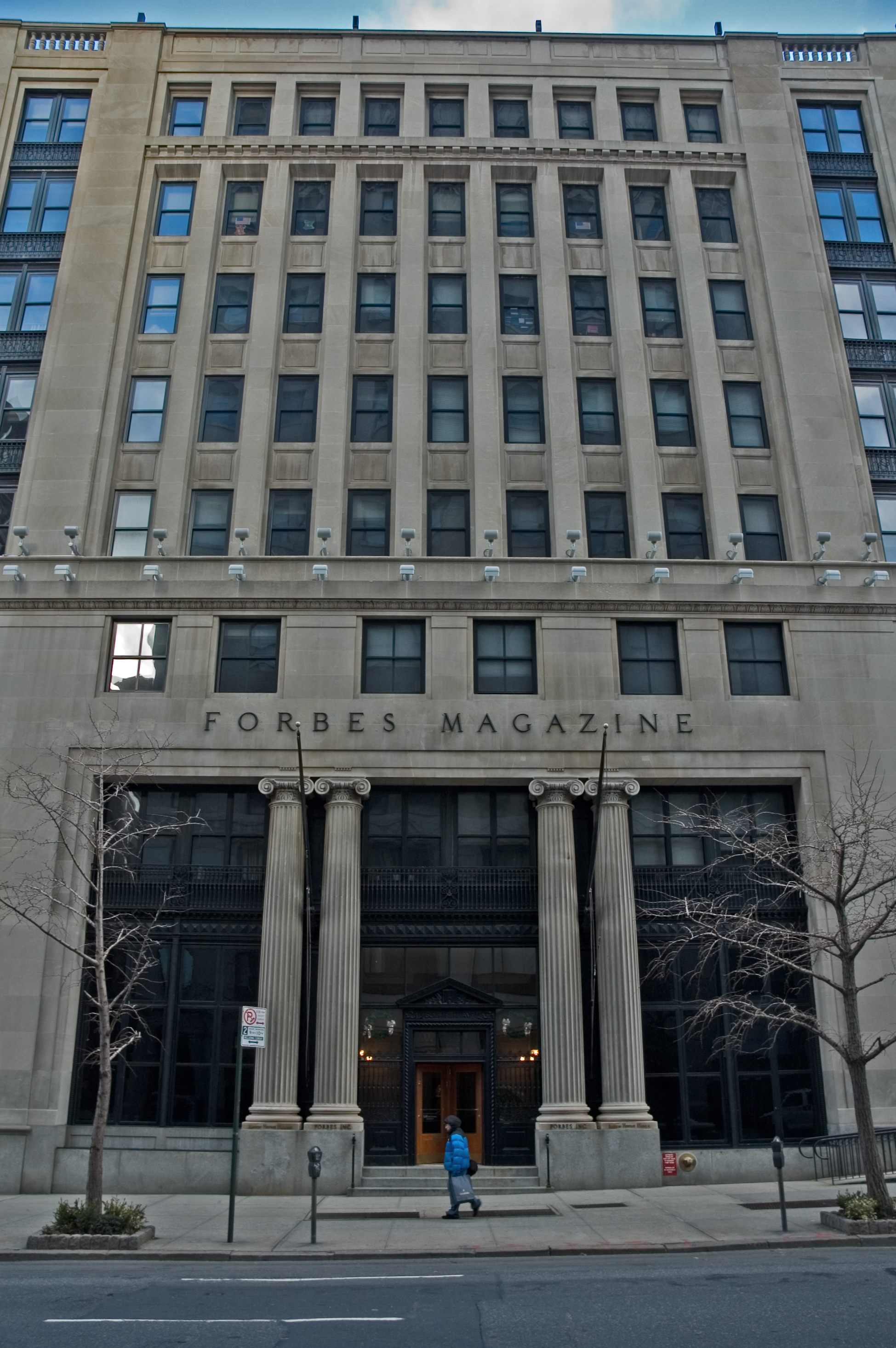
- Forbes Building (Forbes Magazine and American Heritage magazine) in New York City, at 60 Fifth Avenue.
- Dissolved: November 2014
- Location: Forbes Building
- Coordinates: 40°44′06″N 73°59′41″W
- Type: Art gallery
- Website: Forbes Galleries

The Forbes Galleries, housed within the Forbes Building on Fifth Avenue between West 12th and 13th Streets in the Greenwich Village neighborhood of Manhattan, New York City, United States, was the home of Malcolm Forbes' collection, which the Forbes family continued to exhibit following his death.

The galleries closed in November 2014.

The collection stemmed from Forbes' lifelong collection of toys, most of which have since been auctioned off. Among the museum's notable exhibits over time included "Olympic Gold", a collection of medals and other collectibles from some of the world's most accomplished Olympians, a number of Fabergé eggs, an armada of 500 ships and 12,000 toy soldiers and one of the original Monopoly boards.

The museum was more popular with visitors than it was with New Yorkers.

The Forbes Collection of nine Fabergé eggs and 180 other Fabergé items was sold in February 2004 to Viktor Vekselberg for almost $100 million.
