= 48th Street Theatre =

Broadway theater (1912–1955)

- Equity 48th Street Theatre (1922–25); Windsor Theatre (1937–43)
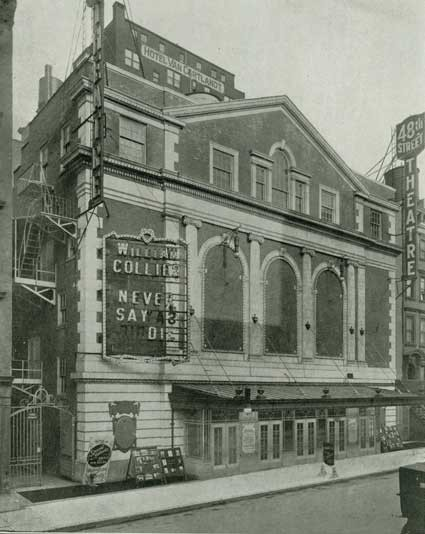
- 48th Street Theatre in 1912
- Interactive map of 48th Street Theatre
- Address: 157 West 48th Street; Manhattan, New York City; United States
- Coordinates: 40.7597°N 73.9833°W
- Type: Broadway

Construction
- Opened: August 12, 1912
- Closed: August 23, 1955
- Demolished: 1955
- Architect: William Albert Swasey

The 48th Street Theatre was a Broadway theatre at 157 West 48th Street in Manhattan. It was built by longtime Broadway producer William A. Brady and designed by architect William Albert Swasey. The venue was also called the Equity 48th Street Theatre (1922–25) and the Windsor Theatre (1937–43).

== History ==
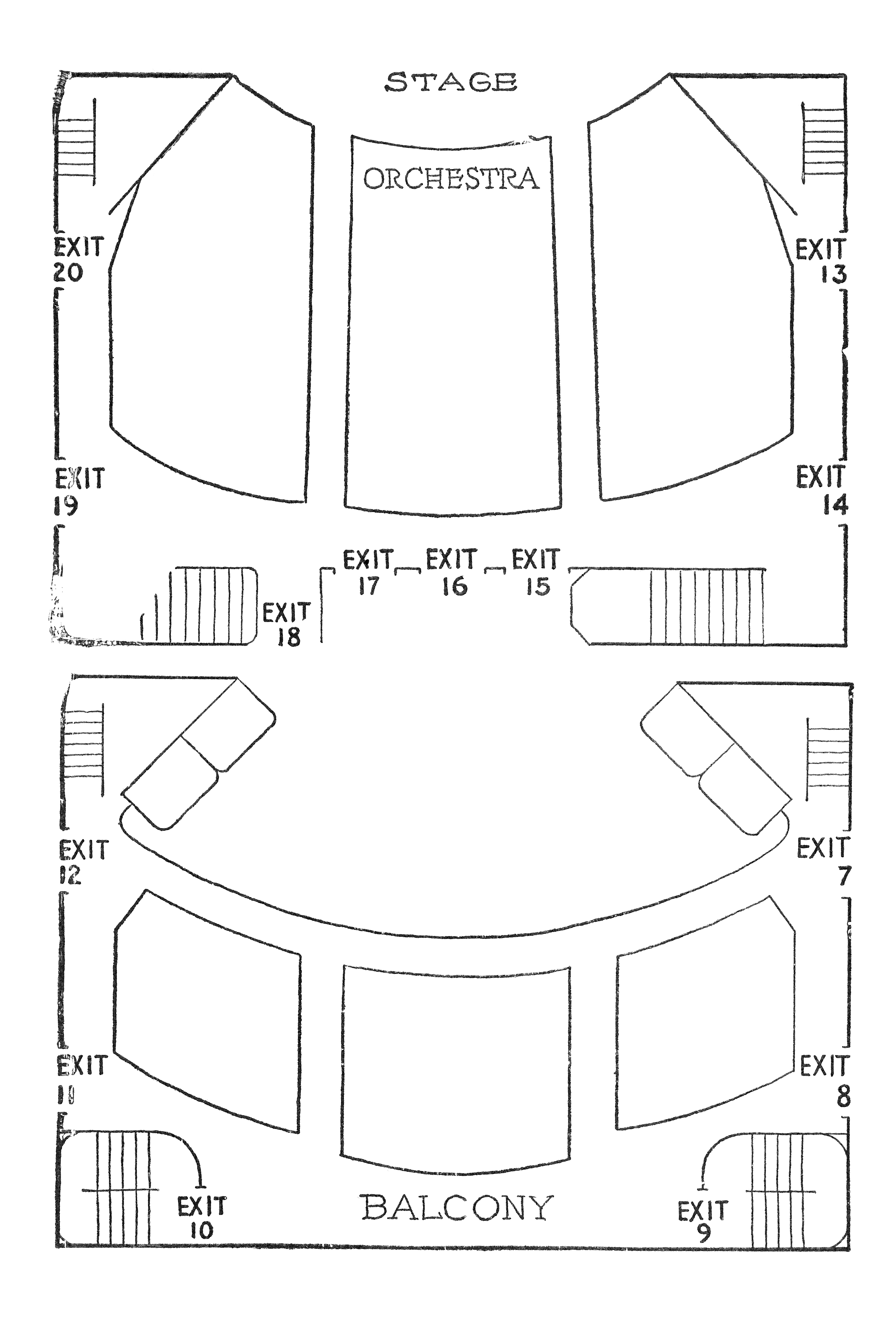
48th Street Theatre seating plan from the playbill for The Broken Wing (1920–21)

The 48th Street Theatre was built in 1912 and had a seating capacity of 969 people. It opened on August 12, 1912, with the play Just Like John by George Broadhurst. Early successes at the theatre included Never Say Die (1912), Today (1913), The Midnight Girl (1914), Just a Woman (1916), The Man Who Stayed at Home (1918), The Storm (1919), and Opportunity (1920) starring Nita Naldi. The Theatre was briefly named the Equity 48th Street Theatre from the premiere of Malvaloca on October 2, 1922, until the premiere of Spooks on June 1, 1925. During this period they had a successful revival of Henrik Ibsen's The Wild Duck.

On April 18, 1926, the theatre featured the professional debut of Martha Graham as an independent dancer and choreographer. Graham and three of her students performed 18 short pieces accompanied by the music of Impressionist composers. Despite poor weather, the evening was a success, which Graham attributed to "curiosity" as people attended to see "a woman who could do her own work".

On November 11, 1926, the theatre premiered The Squall by Jean Bart, starring Blanche Yurka, Romney Brent, and Dorothy Stickney. During the final act of the performance July 26, 1927, 38-year-old screenwriter and film executive June Mathis was stricken and died following a heart attack.

Notable performances at the theatre during this period included Puppy Love (1926) starring Spring Byington, The Pagan Lady (1930) starring Lenore Ulric, and Unexpected Husband (1931) starring Josephine Hull.

The theatre was sold and renamed the Windsor Theatre by producer Sam H. Grisman, beginning with the premiere of Work Is for Horses on November 20, 1937. The Windsor, along with the Princess Theatre, was used for Labor Stage, a project of the International Ladies' Garment Workers' Union, which produced plays and held lectures and meetings. Perhaps the most notable play at the Windsor was a January 3, 1938, revival of Marc Blitzstein's controversial political musical The Cradle Will Rock, produced by Grisman and directed by Orson Welles.

On September 1, 1943, the theatre once again became the 48th Street Theatre. The most successful play in the theatre's history premiered on November 1, 1944: Harvey by Mary Chase and starring Frank Fay, which ran for 1775 performances, won Chase the Pulitzer Prize for Drama, and was adapted into a 1950 film starring James Stewart. Another success at the theatre was Stalag 17 (1951), which was also made into a successful 1953 film.

On August 23, 1955, a rooftop water tank feeding the fire sprinkler system fell through the reinforced concrete roof, and 10,000 gallons of water caused extensive damage to the interior. Dark since the end of Tea and Sympathy in June, the theatre was closed and the building was demolished later that year. A parking garage was built on the site, which was later replaced by the Hard Rock Hotel New York in 2022.

== Notable productions ==
- 1914–15: The Law of the Land
- 1916–17: The Thirteenth Chair
- 1920–21: The Broken Wing
- 1922: The Torch-Bearers
- 1938: The Cradle Will Rock
- 1939–40: Pins and Needles
- 1941: Good Neighbor
- 1942: Under this Roof
- 1944–49: Harvey
- 1951–52: Stalag 17
- 1955: Tea and Sympathy
