= Charles Bittinger =

American painter

Charles Bittinger (June 27, 1879 – December 18, 1970) was an American artist who explored the use of scientific techniques for artistic purposes. During World War I, he also played a prominent role in the development of naval camouflage.

== Background ==
Bittinger was born and raised in Washington, D.C. In 1898, he enrolled at MIT, intending to become a scientist. Two years later, he dropped out and moved to Paris, where he studied at the Sorbonne, the Ecole des Beaux Arts, and the Académie Julian. While in Paris, he met and became married to a concert singer named Edith Gay. Together, they moved back to the U.S. in 1907, and settled in New York City, where he studied at the Art Students League, and became an active participant in prominent artists’ associations and exhibitions, including the National Academy of Design.

== Camouflage research ==
During World War I, Bittinger contributed to American naval camouflage. As an artist who had been trained in science as well, he served with the U.S. Naval Camouflage Section in the research subsection at the Eastman Kodak Laboratories in Rochester, New York. There, he worked with physicist Loyd A. Jones and others on assessing the effectiveness of ship camouflage proposals.

During that war, he also experimented with the camouflage-related use of colored filters, and with using colored lights to conceal aspects of a scene. According to an article in a popular magazine in 1921, he “painted an airplane wing with the German cross upon it, which when viewed by our [U.S.] army through binoculars equipped with a red filter, discloses itself to be not the German cross, but the red, white and blue of the Allies. Thus an airplane could fly unscathed over the German lines and return home again without being fired upon” (Literary Digest 1921).

He resumed his camouflage research in World War II, in the course of which he worked with Everett L. Warner. In 1940, he published an essay on ship camouflage in the Proceedings of the U.S. Naval Institute.

== Art-science explorations ==
Between the World Wars, Bittinger returned to Washington, D.C., and began experiments in the use of scientific findings in devising works of art. For example, in 1929, he created a series of murals, depicting stages in the life of Benjamin Franklin, for the Franklin Institute. These featured double images, one of which had been painted (and could be viewed) under incandescent light, while the other had been painted (and required for viewing) under ultraviolet light. Six years later, he exhibited another comparable painting that, viewed with the unaided eye, depicted the famous transatlantic flight of Charles Lindbergh, but when viewed through an optical instrument that Bittinger had invented, appeared instead to be the Mona Lisa.

== Eyewitness paintings ==
In 1937, the U.S. Navy and the National Geographic Society invited Bittinger to paint on-site a total solar eclipse on Canton Island in the Pacific Ocean. In 1946, he was one of the artists invited by the U.S. Navy to witness and making paintings of the first atomic explosions at the Bikini Atoll, the results of which are now online at the U.S. Naval Historical Center website.

== Inventions ==
According to the records of the U.S. Patent Office, Bittinger is credited with the following patents:

- U.S. Patent No. 1,342,247 [June 1, 1920]: Combining Reflected and Transmitted Light Waves of Varying Lengths to Produce Subjective Changes in Scenic Effects.
- U.S. Patent No. 1,629,250 [May 17, 1927]: Production and Utilization of Diachronic Inks.
- U.S. Patent No. 1,781,999 [March 16, 1929]: Rear View Mirror.
- U.S. Patent No. 1,934,310 [with E.O. Hulburt, November 7, 1933]: Visibility Meter and Method of Measuring Visibility.

== See also ==
- Camouflage
- Everett L. Warner
- Harold Van Buskirk
- Loyd A. Jones
