= Frederick Judd Waugh =

American painter (1861–1940)

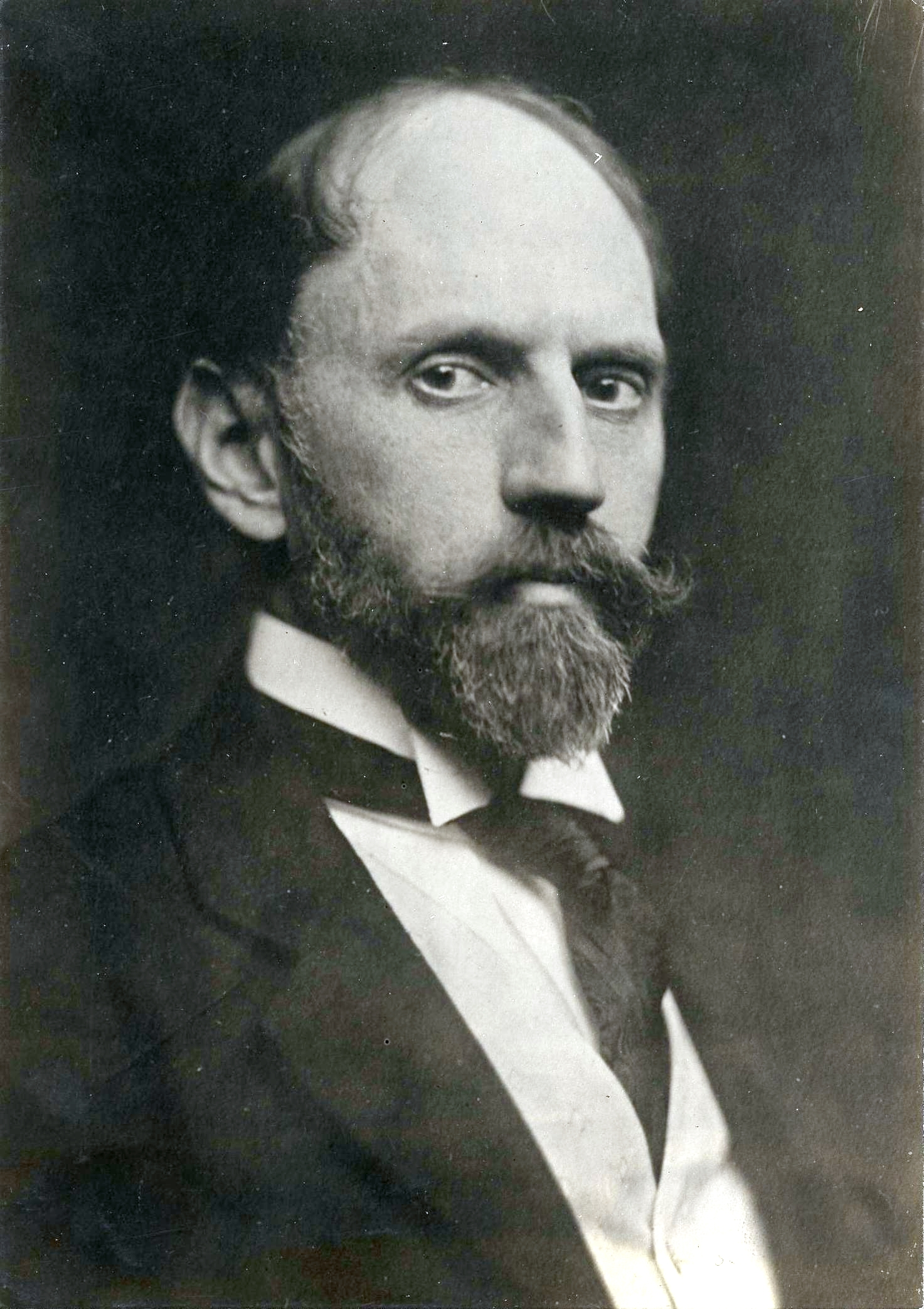
- Born: September 13, 1861; Bordentown, New Jersey
- Died: September 10, 1940 (aged 78)

Frederick Judd Waugh (September 13, 1861 in Bordentown, New Jersey – September 10, 1940) was an American artist, primarily known as a marine artist. During World War I, he designed ship camouflage for the U.S. Navy, under the direction of Everett L. Warner.

== Background and paintings ==
Waugh was the son of a well-known Philadelphia portrait painter, Samuel Waugh. He studied at the Pennsylvania Academy of Fine Arts with Thomas Eakins, and at the Académie Julian in Paris with Adolphe-William Bouguereau. After leaving Paris, he moved to England, residing on the island of Sark in the English Channel, where he made his living as a seascape painter. In 1898 he was recorded as living in Heath and Reach, Bedfordshire.

In 1908, Waugh returned to the U.S., settling in Montclair Heights, New Jersey. He had no studio until art collector William T. Evans (a railroad financier and President of the dry goods firm, Mills Gibbs Corporation) offered him one in exchange for one painting a year. In later years, he lived on Bailey Island, Maine, and in Provincetown, Massachusetts.

Waugh’s marinescapes were highly acclaimed, garnering him the Popular Prize at the Carnegie International Exhibition for five years in a row, a feat accomplished by no other artist. In 1914, he was a judge of the art exhibit on Monhegan Island, ME during the 1914 Ter-Centenary celebration of the Voyage of Captain John Smith.

In addition to his marinescapes, Waugh sometimes published work in periodicals, such as The Green Sheaf, to which he contributed at least one illustration. He also produced paintings and sketches on legendary and mythological themes; see, for instance, his 1921 sketch “Levitation in Dream No. 3”, and his c.1912 painting “The Knight of the Holy Grail”.

== Gallery ==
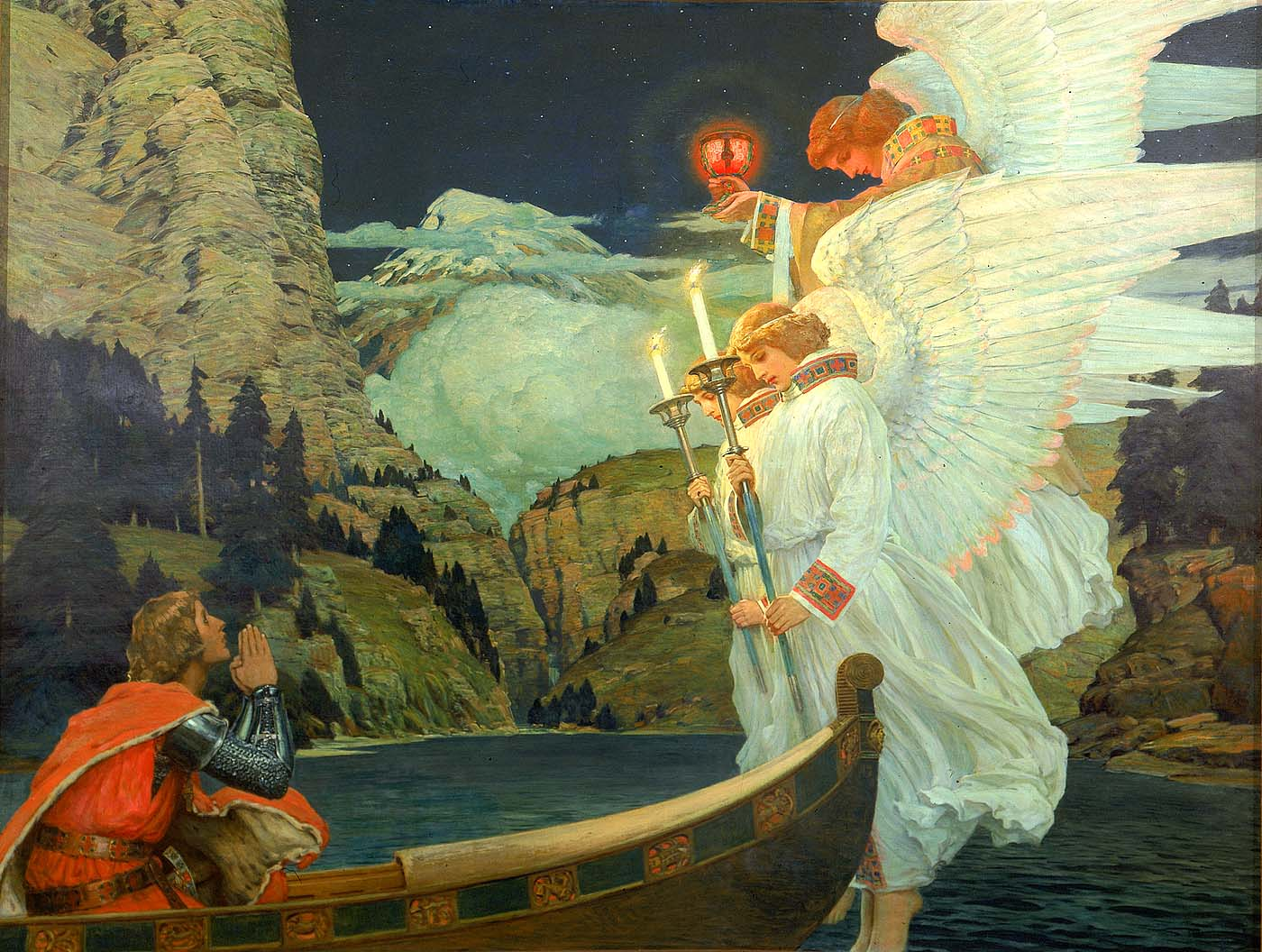
'The Knight of the Holy Grail'

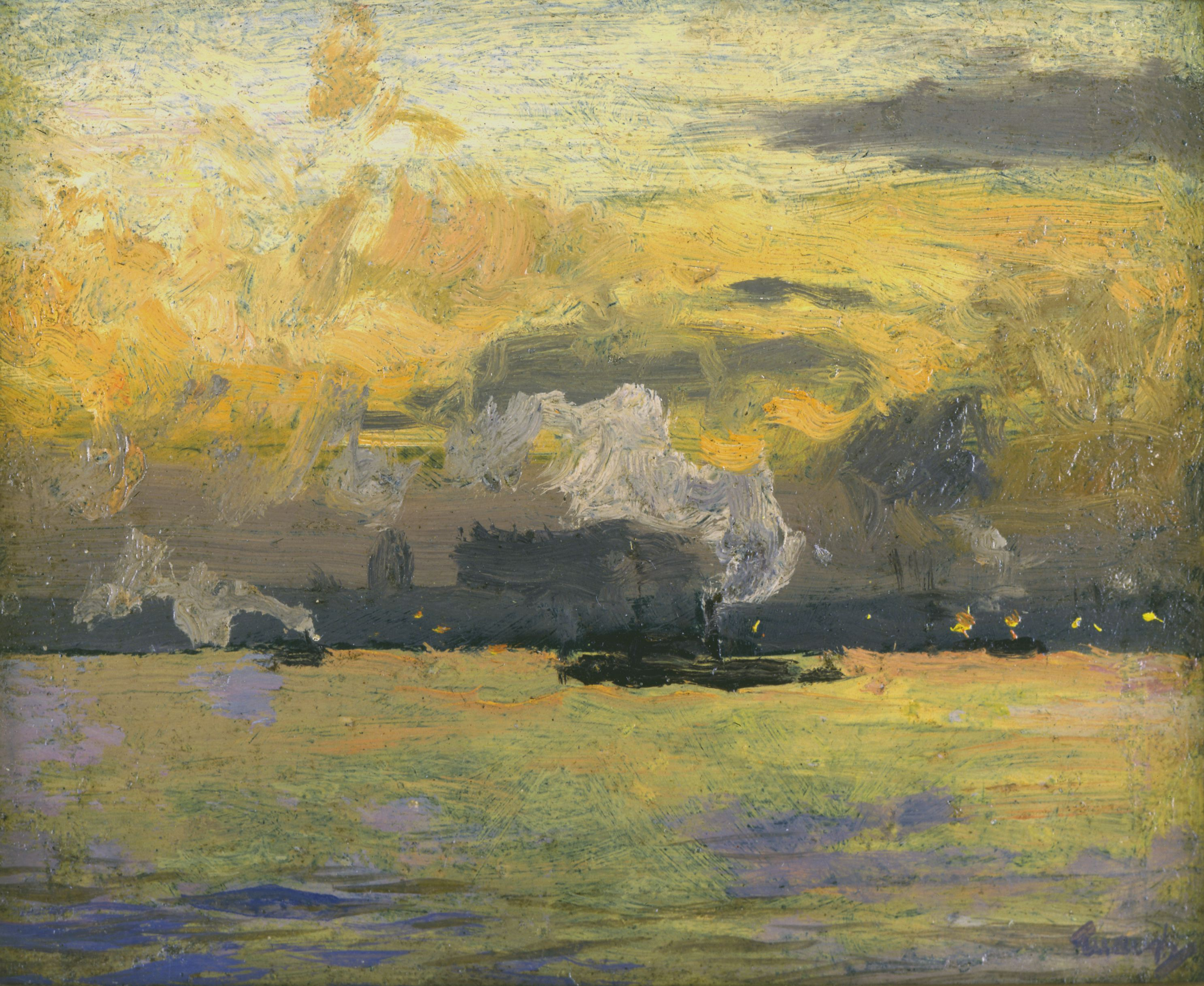
'Jersey City at Sunset'

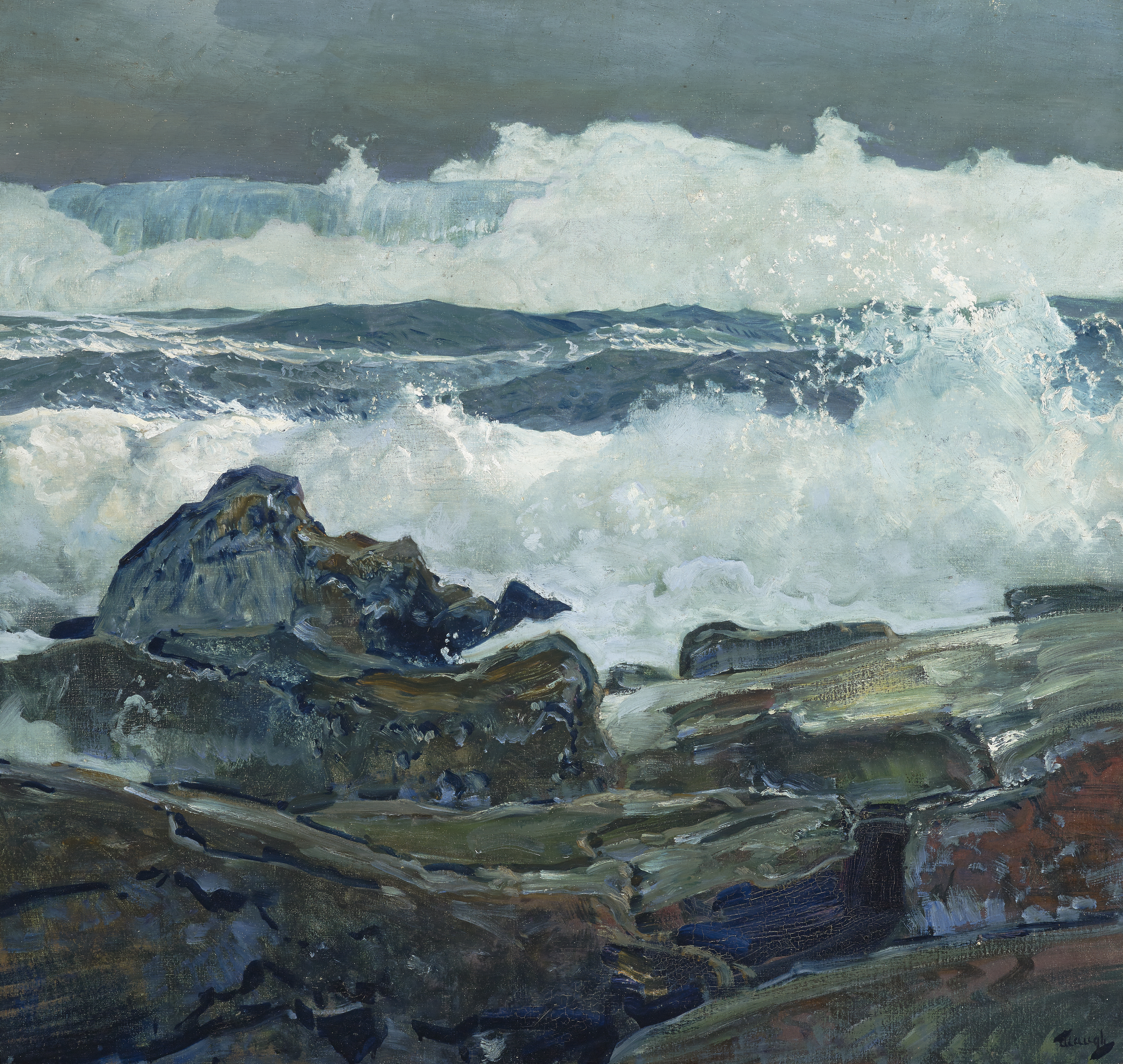
"The Next Wave"

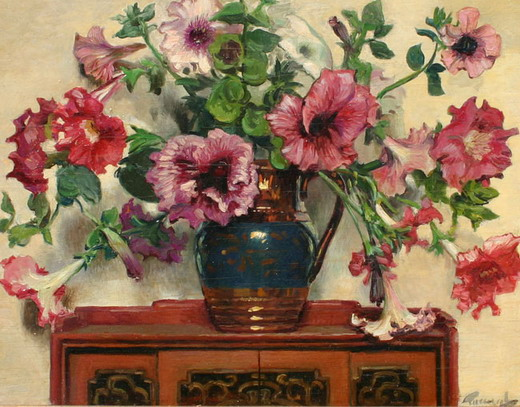
"Still Life"

== Camouflage Service ==
In 1918, Waugh was recommended to serve as a camouflage artist (or camoufleur) for the U.S. Navy, as a member of the Design Section of its marine camouflage unit. That section was located in Washington, D.C., and was headed by American painter Everett L. Warner.

According to a biography of Waugh, “Many large ships, including the Leviathan, were painted according to his designs. Though the enterprise was of course a team effort in which no man played a solo part, he had every reason to be proud of his record. Only one ship with his system of camouflage was lost during the war”.

== Literary works and interest in folklore ==
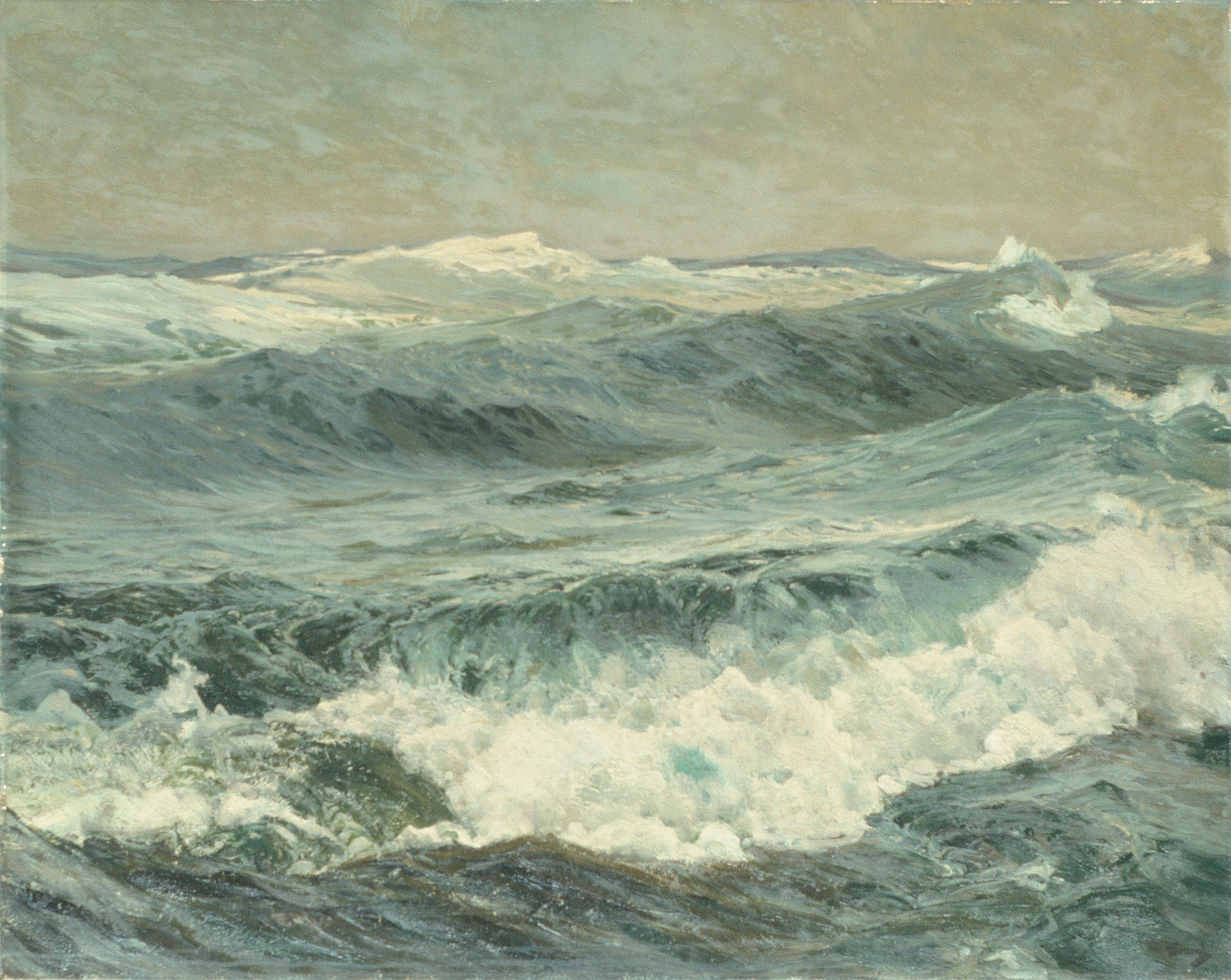
Roaring Forties by Frederick Judd Waugh, currently on display at the Metropolitan Museum of Art.

Waugh was known to produce literary work, publishing a short poem in Pamela Colman Smith’s short-lived periodical The Green Sheaf; a fairy tale in The English Illustrated Magazine; and, in 1916, the book The Clan of Munes. Intended as a work of American folklore aimed at children, the book lays out the fictional history and adventures of the “Munes, or tribe of American Fairies”, creatures Waugh regarded as a “gift to his fellow countrymen”. He reported that the idea for these driftwood-based fairies had come to him two summers previously when painting at Monhegan, Maine.

Together with his non-marine artworks, these pieces reflect Waugh’s lifelong interest in fairy lore and the supernatural. In an interview with New York City paper The Sun (4 November 1916, p. 9), he asserted that he “dreamed dreams and saw visions—real ones”, and described his history of writing fairy tales, along with his regret at burning the stories he had written while in London.

== See also ==
- Wild Weather — seascape by Waugh
- The Clan of Munes — Waugh's only published book
- Dazzle camouflage
- Everett L. Warner
- Harold Van Buskirk

== Sources ==
- Behrens, Roy R. (2002), False Colors: Art, Design and Modern Camouflage. Dysart, IA: Bobolink Books, pp. 82–107. ISBN 0-9713244-0-9.
- —— (2009), Camoupedia: A Compendium of Research on Art, Architecture and Camouflage. Dysart, IA: Bobolink Books, pp. 374–376. ISBN 978-0-9713244-6-6.
- Havens, George R. (1969), Frederick J. Waugh: American Marine Painter. Orono, ME; University of Maine Press.
- New York Times (1940), “F.J. Waugh Is Dead; Marine Artist, 79” (September 11).
- Warner, Everett L. (1919), “Fooling the Iron Fish: The Inside Story of Marine Camouflage” in Everybody’s Magazine (November), pp. 102–109.
