= William Edwards Cook =

American painter

William Edwards Cook (August 31, 1881 – November 10, 1959) was an American-born expatriate artist, architectural patron, and long-time friend of American writer Gertrude Stein. Following his 1903 departure from the U.S., Cook resided in Paris, Rome, Russia, and on the island of Mallorca, in the Balearic Islands off the eastern coast of Spain. Today he is chiefly remembered not for his artistic achievements, but because, during World War I, he taught Stein to drive an automobile so that she could contribute to the French war effort, and because, in 1926, he commissioned the Swiss architect Le Corbusier (whose career was at an early stage) to design an innovative cubist home, on the outskirts of Paris, now called Maison Cook or Villa Cook.

== Formative years ==
Cook grew up in the small community of Independence, Iowa, in the northeast section of the state. In the early 1890s, it was nationally known as a horseracing center, a distinction that earned it the popular name of the Lexington of the North. The son of an Iowa lawyer who also owned a number of farms, Cook left home to study at the Art Institute of Chicago in 1898 and then, shortly after that, at the National Academy of Design in New York. As was customary among aspiring artists, he then moved on to Paris in 1903, where he was a student of animal painter Jean-Paul Laurens and the famous (if much maligned) French academic master, the aging Adolphe-William Bouguereau, at the Académie Julian.

== Society painter ==
A boost in Cook's career took place in 1907, when, while living temporarily in Rome, his request was approved by the Vatican to paint a portrait of Pope Pius X (the first American to do so). As a result, Cook was soon regarded as a young society artist (somewhat in the manner of John Singer Sargent, whom he admired and was acquainted with), and so received a flood of requests from other dignitaries to have their portraits painted.

== Expatriate modernist ==
When Cook returned to Paris, he became somehow acquainted with Gertrude Stein and her companion, Alice B. Toklas. Consequently, the three became close and loyal friends, in part because he frequently brought influential visitors to the Saturday evening soirees at Stein's apartment at 27 rue de Fleurus, among them (as Stein reported later in her first autobiography) "a great many from Chicago, very wealthy stout ladies and equally wealthy tall good-looking thin ones." By way of her soirees and other events, Stein introduced Cook to scores of Modern-era artists and writers, including Pablo Picasso, Georges Braque, Henri Matisse, Ernest Hemingway, Guillaume Apollinaire, Jacques Lipchitz, Robert Graves, and so on.

== Friendship with Stein ==
On a more personal level, Stein and Cook were also friends for other reasons. Shortly before World War I, Stein and Toklas ended up vacationing together on the Spanish island of Mallorca with (by coincidence) Cook and his mistress, a French artist's model and cleaning woman named Jeanne Moallic. Eventually, when the two couples returned to Paris, Cook worked in an automobile factory, then became a taxi driver, in the course of which he also test-drove Renaults. Using his taxi, Cook became Stein's driving instructor, so that she and Toklas could transport supplies for the French war effort. During this same time period, Cook may also have become a clandestine agent for the U.S. Secret Service, while continuing to work as a taxi driver. Inadvertently (as described in a piece called "A Movie" by Stein), he and Moallic apparently contributed to the arrest of U.S. Army thieves, with the result that they were invited to ride (together, in their Renault) in the famous victory parade through the Arc de Triomphe in July 1919. For several years after the war, Cook was a Red Cross worker in the Caucasus region of the USSR (and perhaps, as is sometimes suggested, a Secret Service source as well), providing food and other aid to refugees in the aftermath of the Russian Revolution of 1917. Prior to Cook's departure on that, he and Moallic were married on March 2, 1922, at an informal ceremony in which Stein and Toklas were their legal witnesses.

== Maison Cook ==
Cook's father died in 1924, at which time he became an heir (along with a sister and two brothers) to a substantial amount of money. In connection with the settlement of his parents' estate, as well as to enable his wife to get to know his relatives (and vice versa), the Cooks drove across the U.S., from east to west and back again, during a period of about five months in 1925, staying for one month in his Iowa hometown. Returning to Europe, they decided to permanently settle in France. The sculptor Jacques Lipchitz introduced them to architect Le Corbusier, then largely unknown, who, during this time, was designing a series of villas, including innovative homes for Michael Stein (Gertrude's brother) and Lipchitz himself. In 1926, they commissioned the architect to design what Le Corbusier said was the first "true cubic house," called Villa Cook or Maison Cook, on the outskirts of Paris, at 6 rue Denfert Rochereau in Boulogne-sur-Seine.

== Later life ==
In his later life, as a friend of Stein's once noted, Cook was primarily known as "the occupant of a house built by Le Corbusier." Already dismayed in the 1930s by his continuing lack of success as an artist, he apparently gave up painting, moved temporarily in Rome, and then settled with his wife in 1936 in Palma de Mallorca, in the Balearic Islands. Mallorca had by then become an affordable refuge for expatriate artists and writers, most notably Robert Graves. In their declining years, both William and Jeanne Cook turned to painting, and both became active participants in the island's artistic community. They spent their remaining years in the El Terreno district of Palma de Mallorca and are buried in above ground vaults in a small religious cemetery in the nearby district of Genova.

== Afterword ==
As a friend of Gertrude Stein, Cook was one of the few who remained loyal to her throughout their lives. In part, this may have been because, without exception, she always wrote nice things about him. As American writer Robert McAlmon once said to Cook (as the latter reports in his letters), "[Stein] treats you better than anyone else. I think she likes you." To which Cook replied, "Of course, she always did, and I always liked her." In Stein's writings, there are frequent references to Cook, but almost never to his art. When conversing, they apparently almost always talked about bullfighting, religion, money, automobiles, and memories of their respective childhoods in the country that they both still loved (if preferably from a distance), the place that they fondly referred to in conversation and correspondence as "our native land."

== Sources ==
- Correspondence of William E. Cook and Gertrude Stein in the collection of the Beinecke Library, Yale University
- Roy Behrens "Cook, His Wife, Two Thieves and the Pope" in Tractor: Iowa Arts and Culture. Vol 6 No 1 (Winter 1998).
- Roy Behrens Cook Book: Gertrude Stein, William Cook and Le Corbusier (Bobolink Books, 2005). ISBN 0-9713244-1-7.
- Rosalind Moad 1914-16: Years of Innovation in Gertrude Stein's Writing PhD dissertation (UK: University of York, 1995).
- Gertrude Stein The Autobiography of Alice B. Toklas (Harcourt Brace, 1933).
- Gertrude Stein Everybody's Autobiography (Random House, 1937).
- Roy Behrens "An Iowa artist's adventures with the Lost Generation in Paris: The enduring friendship of William Edwards Cook and Gertrude Stein" in Iowa History Journal. (July-August 2024). Online link
