= Everett Warner =

American painter

Everett Longley Warner
- Born: July 16, 1877; Vinton, Iowa
- Died: October 20, 1963 (aged 86); Bellows Falls, Vermont
- Known for: Painting, Etching, Ship camouflage
- Movement: American Impressionism

Everett Longley Warner (July 16, 1877 – October 20, 1963) was an American Impressionist painter and printmaker, as well as a leading contributor to US Navy camouflage during both World Wars.

== Early years ==
Warner was born in the small town of Vinton, Iowa, where his father was a lawyer. His mother was descended from a line of prominent missionaries (the Riggs family), who worked extensively for years with the Dakota Sioux Indians, translating and preserving their traditional language. Warner spent part of his childhood in Iowa, then moved to Washington, D.C., when his father was appointed Examiner for the Bureau of Pensions.

While completing high school, he also went to classes at the Corcoran Museum and the Washington Art Students League. Following that, he was employed for several years as an art critic for the (Washington) Evening Star. In 1900, he moved to New York and studied at the Art Students League with life drawing master George Bridgman and illustrator Walter Clark. His work was soon selected for inclusion in some of the country's most prestigious art competitions, at the Art Institute of Chicago, the Pennsylvania Academy of the Fine Arts and the National Academy of Design.

== Artistic career ==
In 1903, with earnings from his painting sales, Warner traveled to Europe (he would visit there again four years later), where he studied in Paris at the Académie Julian, while also making sketching trips to Italy, Germany, Spain, the Netherlands, and other countries. Returning permanently to the US in 1909, he became affiliated with the Old Lyme Art Colony at Old Lyme, Connecticut, which (under the sponsorship of art patron Florence Griswold) had become a well-known center for American Impressionism. One of the leading participants in that colony was Childe Hassam, who was a close associate of Abbott H. Thayer, a painter who was widely known for his theories of natural camouflage.

In 1915, at the Panama–Pacific International Exposition in San Francisco, Warner won a silver medal in the painting category, and a bronze medal in printmaking. Featured prominently at that World's Fair were the allegorical sculptures of Iowa-born artist Sherry Edmundson Fry, who was awarded a silver medal, and who, a few years later, teamed up with New Hampshire painter Barry Faulkner (Thayer's cousin) to establish an artists' camouflage corps. Ironically, at around this time, an inevitable decline began in the career prospects of all these young artists, many of whom were very gifted, largely because of the interest in Modern Art, which had been loudly introduced to the American public in 1913 at the famous New York Armory Show. As noted by Helen K. Fusscas in A World Observed: The Art of Everett Longley Warner, "By introducing European modernism to this country, the Armory Show [eventually] made American Impressionism seem decidedly old-fashioned and uninteresting." In the years that followed, Warner and the others continued to work as artists, to exhibit, and to win awards, but they never achieved the stature that they might once have anticipated.

== WWI ship camouflage ==
When the US entered World War I in 1917, Warner searched for ways to contribute to the war effort. He considered a range of options, and even applied for the American Camouflage Corps. For many years, one of his closest friends had been the MIT-trained scientist and Paris-trained artist Charles Bittinger (1879–1970), who would later play a prominent role in World War II ship camouflage. It may have been through Bittinger that Warner was approached by the US Shipping Board (in the summer of 1917) to carry out a camouflage scheme invented by Thomas A. Edison. Using Edison's specifications, Warner applied that scheme to a former German ocean liner, the SS Ockenfels. Although the result was intended to be an "invisible ship," it was not only readily visible but was structurally absurd as well, with the result that a section attached to the bow had fallen off before the ship left New York harbor. Recalling that fiasco, Warner said, "Thereafter I was for distortion patterns which make a ship hard to hit—not hard to see."

A few months later, Warner presented his own ship camouflage plan to the US government. According to existing records, he argued that it is "impossible to make a ship invisible from a submarine, because she was almost invariably outlined against the sky and consequently would show up in silhouette. His proposal, therefore, was to break up the silhouette in such as way as to make it very difficult for the enemy to obtain the range." This method, known officially as the Warner System, was one of six camouflage measures approved by the US, with others having been devised by George de Forest Brush (in partnership with his son Gerome Brush, and with Abbott H. Thayer), William Mackay, Lewis Edward Herzog, Maximilian Toch, and a person named Watson.

In February 1918, Warner accepted a commission as a lieutenant in the US Naval Reserves, and was assigned to manage a design-based subdivision (in Washington, D.C.) of a newly formed American Camouflage Section. Among his fellow camouflage designers were Frederick Judd Waugh (marine painter), Gordon Stevenson (portrait painter), John Gregory (British-born sculptor), Kenneth MacIntire, M. O'Connell (advertising artist), M. Nash, and a Navy ensign named Richardson. Concurrently, a research-based subdivision was set up at Eastman Kodak Company in Rochester, New York, under the direction of Lieutenant Loyd A. Jones, an optical physiologist. The officer in charge of both subdivisions was Lieutenant Harold Van Buskirk.

None of this was without precedent, and to large extent these efforts were derived from the work of the British, who had set up a similar team in 1917. That unit was directed by British painter Norman Wilkinson, who is now widely credited with having originated the practice of dazzle-painting or dazzle camouflage. In March 1918, Wilkinson served for four weeks as a camouflage advisor to the US Navy. His escort during that visit to the US (during which he lectured at harbors at Boston, New York, Philadelphia, and Norfolk on the purpose, design and application of dazzle painting) was Everett Warner.

== Aerial paintings ==
In 1919, after World War I had ended, the Navy was typically slow to arrange for Warner's discharge. Bored and frustrated, he devised a painting experiment, by which he could make positive use of his remaining months in the Navy. For a period of three or four weeks, he arranged for daily observation flights in military seaplanes over such areas as New York City and the Eastern seaboard. He became one of the first artists to sketch and paint from an aerial view. He extended his experiment by making large paintings from the small ones he had made in flight. In planning the exhibition of these, it occurred to him that they should not hang on the wall, but be positioned on the floor, flat and face-up, while the audience would view them from the side, at an oblique angle (as in anamorphosis), thereby enhancing the feeling of depth.

== Teaching ==
For 18 years, from 1924 to 1942, Warner was an associate professor of painting and design at the College of Fine Arts at the Carnegie Institute of Technology in Pittsburgh, Pennsylvania. Surely, it was not an entire coincidence that the man who hired him for that position, Homer Saint-Gaudens (son of the celebrated sculptor Augustus Saint-Gaudens), had been the officer in charge of the American Army's Camouflage Corps during World War I. Nan Sheets was among the artists who studied with him.

== World War II camouflage ==
In early 1941, after viewing a newsreel showing what he considered amateurish dazzle camouflage on Royal Navy Ships, he wrote a letter to the US Navy offering his services. At the time, the Navy did not anticipate using disruptive camouflage schemes and declined his offer. In the summer of 1942, after the US had entered World War II, Warner (then age 65) was asked to return to the Navy, to serve as Chief Civilian Aid to Commander Charles Bittinger (his close friend from earlier years) in the design of ship camouflage. As the techniques for observation had changed in the years since World War I, so too did ship deception needs. While much of World War II American ship camouflage was disruptive and deceptive (rather than directed toward invisibility), its newly restrained, geometric style (akin perhaps to Modern Art) was vastly different from the dazzle designs of the previous war. Among those who worked with Warner in developing the new designs were Bennet Buck, Sheffield Kagy, William Walters, Arthur Conrad and Robert R. Hays.

== Later years ==
At the end of World War II, Warner was discharged from the Navy. At age 68, he retired from teaching, and settled with his family in Westmoreland, New Hampshire. His attempts to revive his painting career, while admirable, were less successful than he hoped, and (recalling his early days as an art critic) he gradually abandoned art in favor of writing articles for publication.

Everett Longley Warner died of a heart attack on October 20, 1963, at age 86. Nine years later, his painting studio was destroyed in a major fire, resulting in the tragic loss of many of his drawings, paintings, letters, notes and camouflaged ship models.

== See also ==
- Norman Wilkinson (artist)
- Dazzle camouflage

== Sources ==
- Behrens, Roy R., False Colors: Art, Design and Modern Camouflage. Dysart, Iowa: Bobolink Books, 2002. ISBN 0-9713244-0-9.
- Behrens, Roy R., Camoupedia: A Compendium of Research on Art, Architecture and Camouflage. Dysart, Iowa: Bobolink Books, 2009. ISBN 978-0-9713244-6-6.
- Helen K. Fusscas, A World Observed: The Art of Everett Longley Warner 1877-1963. Exhibition catalog. Old Lyme, Connecticut: Florence Griswold Museum, 1992.
- Everett L. Warner, "The Science of Marine Camouflage Design" in Transactions of the Illuminating Engineering Society 14 (5) 1919, pp. 215–219.
- Everett L. Warner, "Fooling the Iron Fish: The Inside Story of Marine Camouflage" in Everybody's Magazine (November 1919), pp. 102–109.
