= George Remington Havens =

American scholar of French literature (1890–1977)

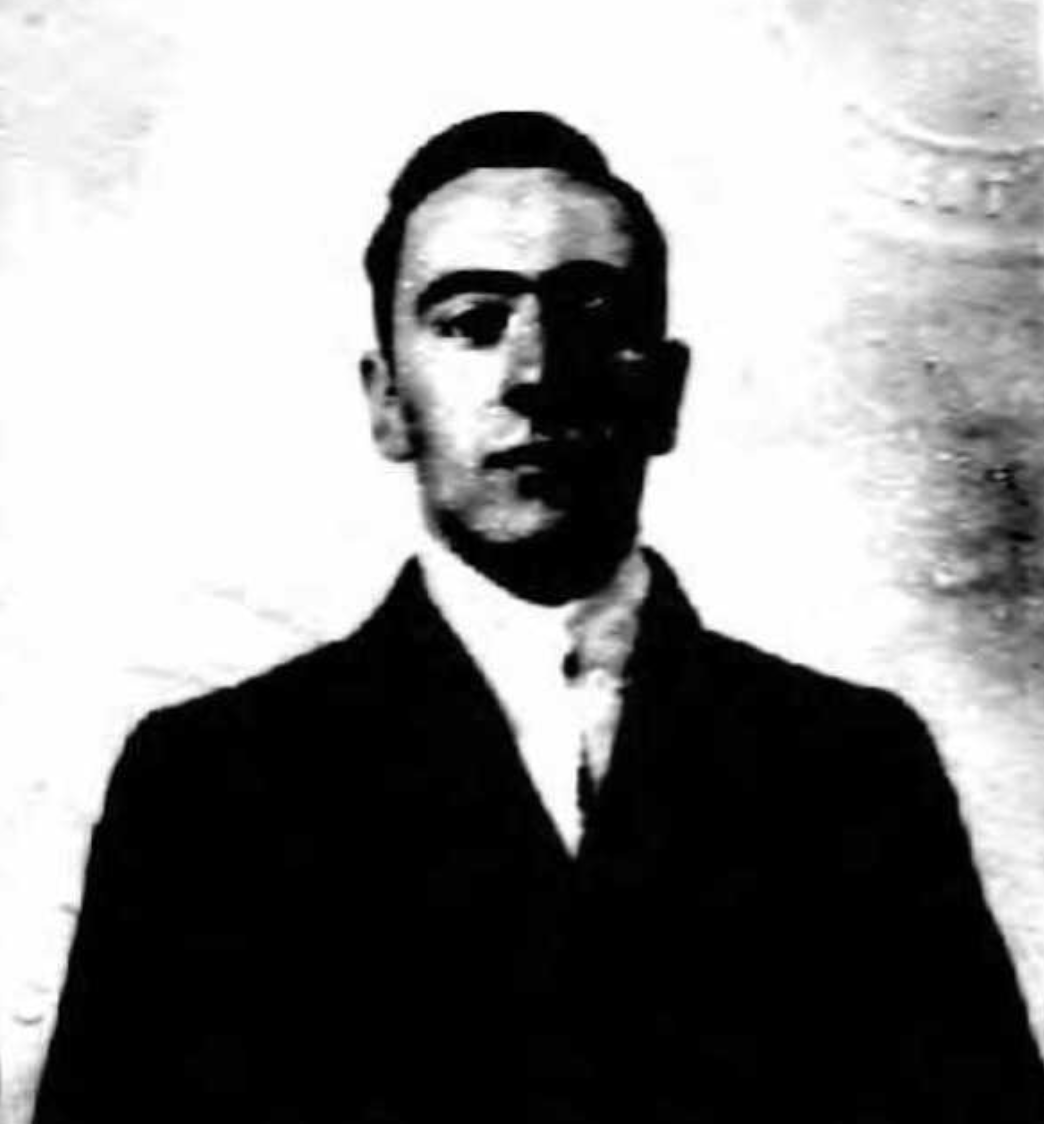
Portrait of George R. Havens

George Remington Havens (25 August 1890, Shelter Island Heights, New York – 28 September 1977, Columbus, Ohio) was an American professor of French. His publications on French literature focussed on Voltaire and Rousseau.

== Biography ==
Havens graduated from Amherst College in 1913. In 1917 he received his Ph.D. from Johns Hopkins University with thesis The Abbé Prévost and English literature (published in 1921). He married Edith Louise Curtiss (known as "Louise") on 18 July 1917 in Los Angeles. From 1917 to 1919 he served as a naval officer in the United States Fleet Reserve and attained the rank of second lieutenant.

Havens was a professor of French at Ohio State University from 1919 to 1961, when he retired as professor emeritus. During various summers, he taught at a number of universities, including the University of Chicago, the University of Pennsylvania, and Columbia University.

He enjoyed a national and international reputation in the field of eighteenth-century French studies.

Havens made two trips to Leningrad, one in 1927 and the other in 1930, to study Voltaire's books housed in the National Library of Russia. He was a Guggenheim Fellow for the academic year 1929–1930. He received honorary doctorates from Ohio State University and University of Michigan.

Havens called his wife "his first and best of readers". She survived him by about three months.

== Selected publications ==
- as editor: Selections from Voltaire with explanatory comment upon his life and works, New York/London 1925, 1930; New York 1969
- Voltaire's Marginalia on the pages of Rousseau. A comparative study of ideas, Columbus 1933, reprint, New York 1966, 1971
- as editor: Voltaire, Candide, ou, L’optimisme, New York 1934, 1969
- as editor: Jean-Jacques Rousseau, Discours sur les sciences et les arts, New York 1946
- as editor with Donald F. Bond: The eighteenth century, Syracuse, New York 1951 (series A critical bibliography of French literature with general editor David Clark Cabeen, vol. 4)
  - as author: Chapter VII. Voltaire pp. 182–207
- The age of ideas. From reaction to revolution in eighteenth-century France, New York 1955, 1965
- as editor with Norman L. Torrey: Voltaire's catalogue of his library at Ferney, Geneva 1959
- Frederick J. Waugh. American marine painter, Orono, Maine 1969 (See Frederick Judd Waugh.)
- Jean-Jacques Rousseau, Boston 1978
