= The Clan of Munes =

1916 novel by Frederick Judd Waugh

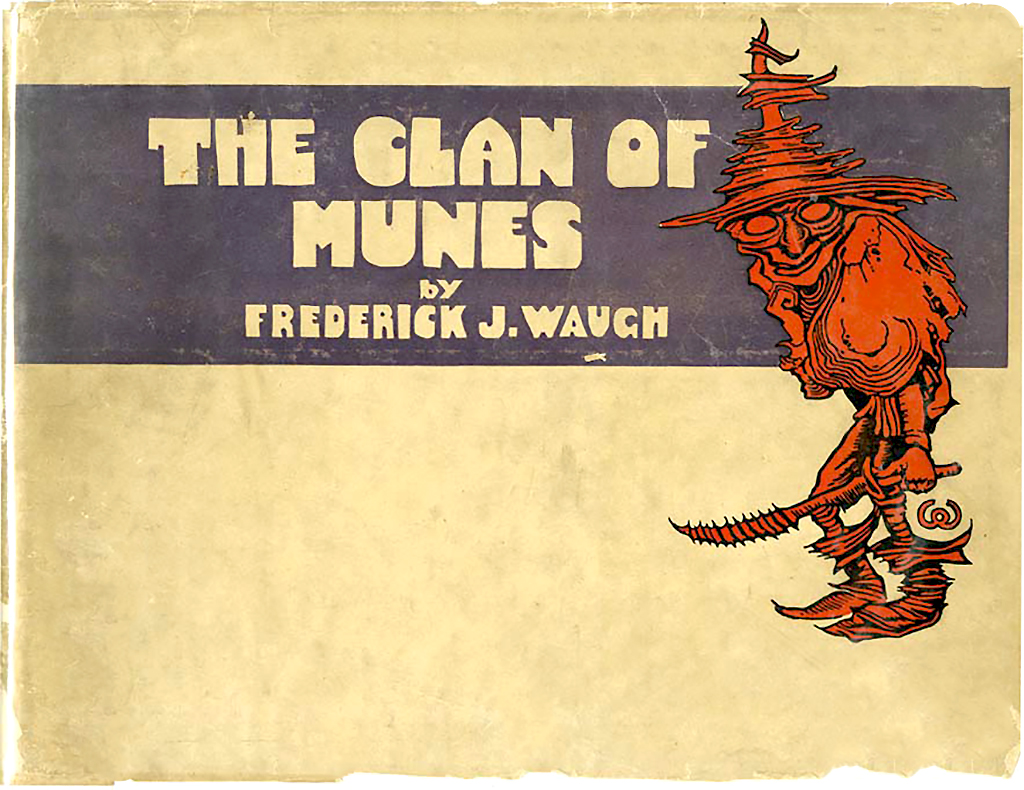
Original cover (1916)

The Clan of Munes is a fantasy novel and children's book by American painter and illustrator Frederick Judd Waugh. The self-illustrated novel was published by Charles Scribner's Sons in 1916 and remained the only book published by the popular marine painter.

== Plot ==
The story is told from the perspective of first-person narrator.

Beneath the Earth's crust a big bubble of gas explodes where the sea is 50 fathoms deep. Following the impact of the explosion, rocks and sand are catapulted to the surface. Birds drop seeds onto them that grow into huge spruce trees. One day an Indian wizard from the north, who is striving for being a mighty magician in style of the Tlingit or Haida, arrives. He collects some of the spruce woods lying around, builds characters out of them and brings them to life by showering them with a magic potion and burying them in the deep snow. Bit by bit he gives his so-called munes characteristics to his taste and makes them immune to fire. Soon, however, his spells reach their limits and he has to recognize that his creation develops a life of its own. After a phase of lethargy the wizard gets rid of an usurper and regains control over his tribe of munes. He creates cows, whose milk the munes feast on until they get fat, and a monstrous ant that gnaws the fat off their bodies again. After all, the wood people have enough of the wizard and his magic, destroy his house and his possessions and chase him away in order to finally be able to lead a self-determined life.

== Illustrations ==
The Clan of Munes illustrations (1914–1916)

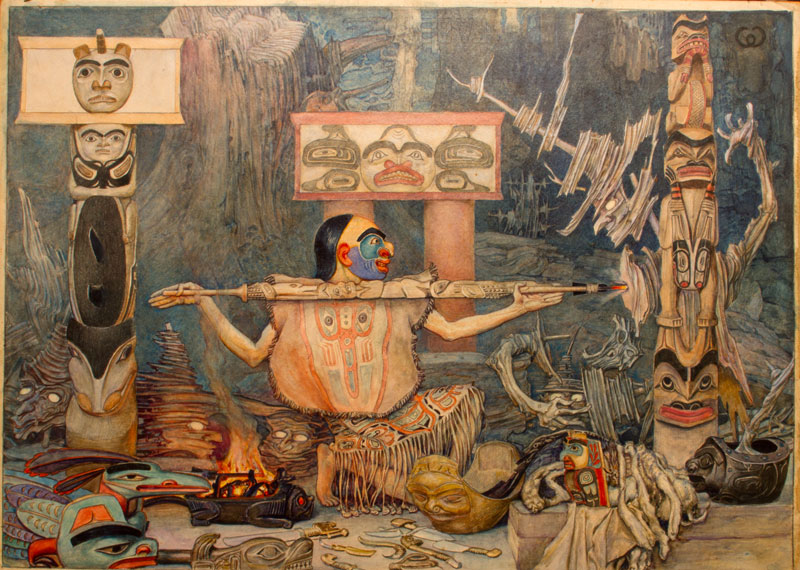
The wizard prepares the summoning of the munes

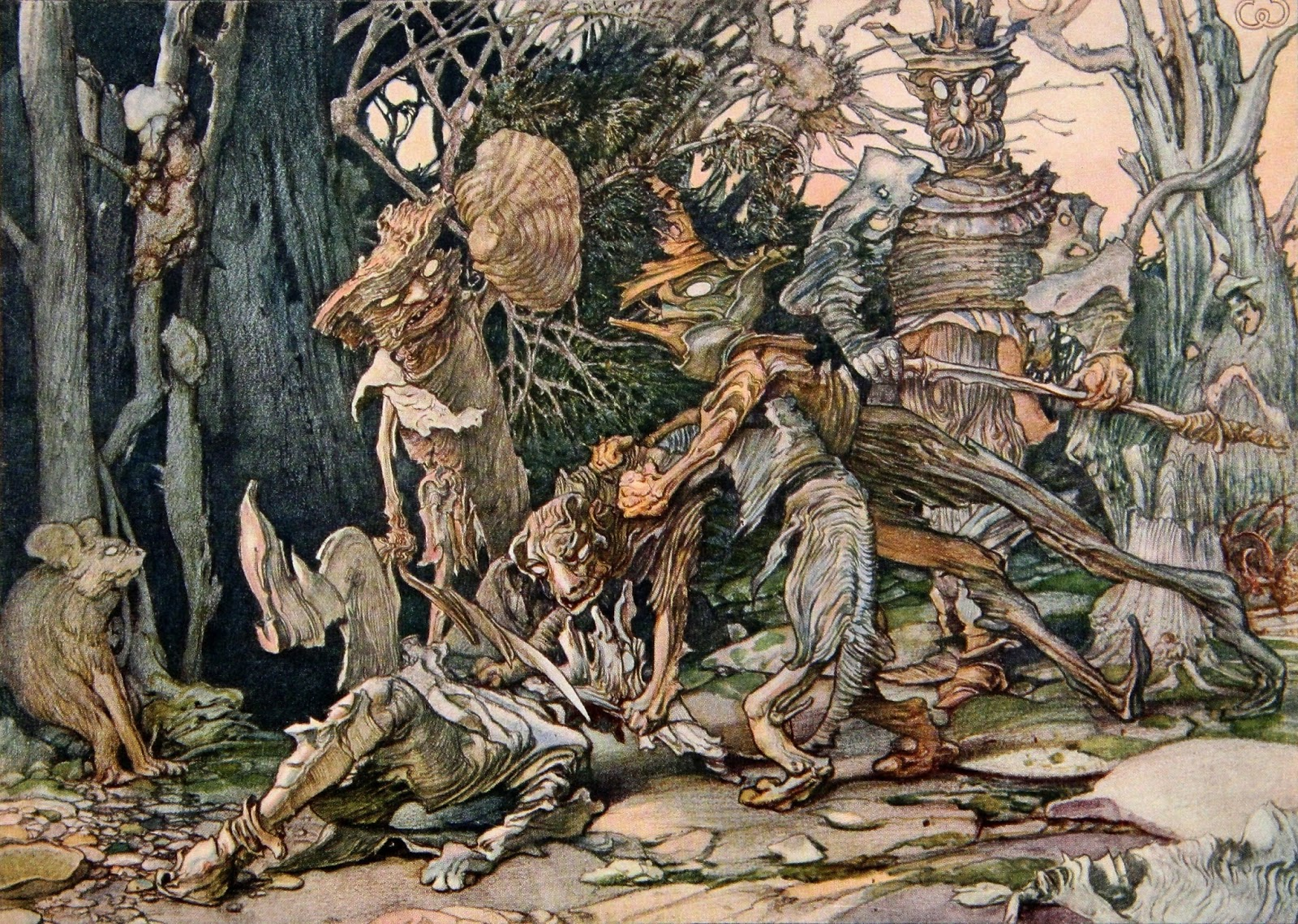
Munes with a dog

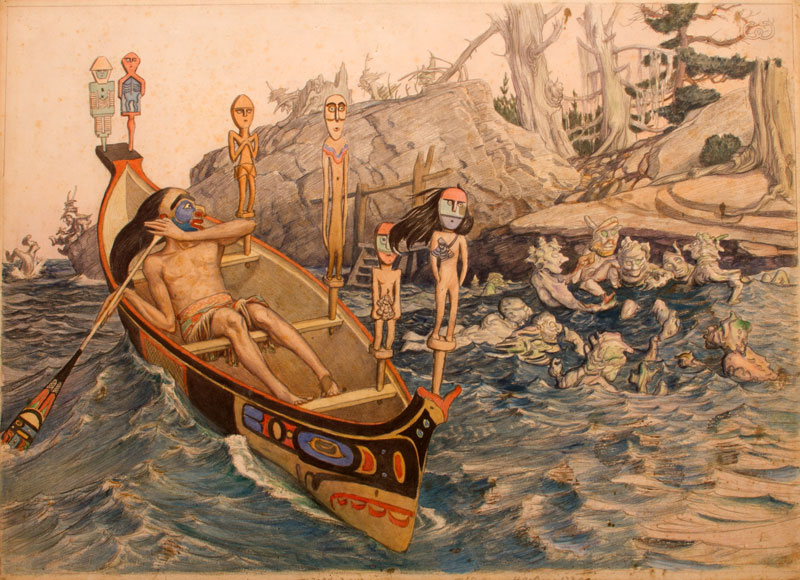
The wizard overhears a group of munes from a canoe

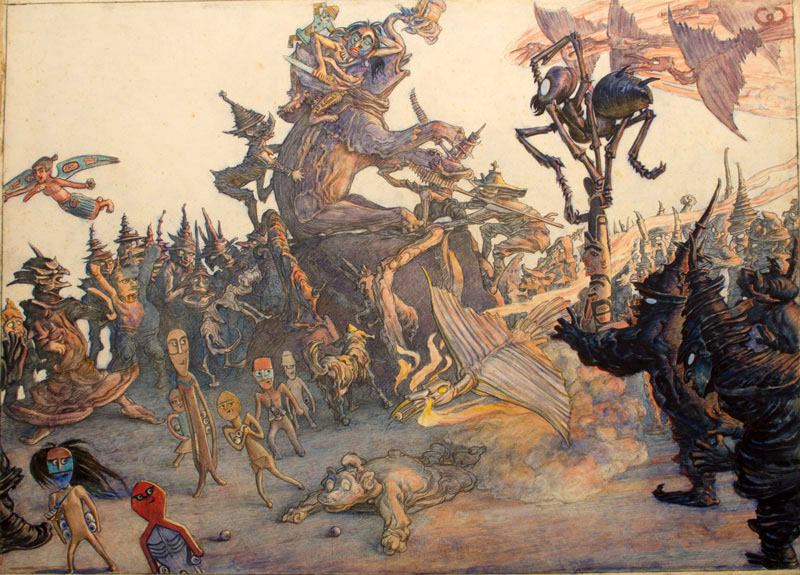
The munes chase away the wizard and his totems

== Background ==
Frederick Judd Waugh first visited the artist colony Monhegan, Maine, in 1911. In the following years he spent much time on the little island twelve miles from the mainland as he took a break from painting and sketching. On the rocky coast he collected gnarled roots and branches of spruce trees which he transformed into the main characters of a fairytale for his family. Within four years the artist created a story with illustrations inspired by the indigenous people Haida and Tlingit in the Pacific Northwest. The full novel was published in November 1916 by Charles Scribner's Sons. Although it received positive reviews the 56-pages book remained a slow seller and Waugh bought back the remaining copies from the publisher. As a result, only few of them are in circulation today and are offered on the internet at high prices.

All 28 original drawings are in the possession of the Edwin A. Ulrich Museum of Art at Wichita State University. They were last exhibited at the beginning of 2014 together with two hand-crafted munes.
