= Wild Weather (Frederick Judd Waugh) =

Painting by Frederick Judd Waugh

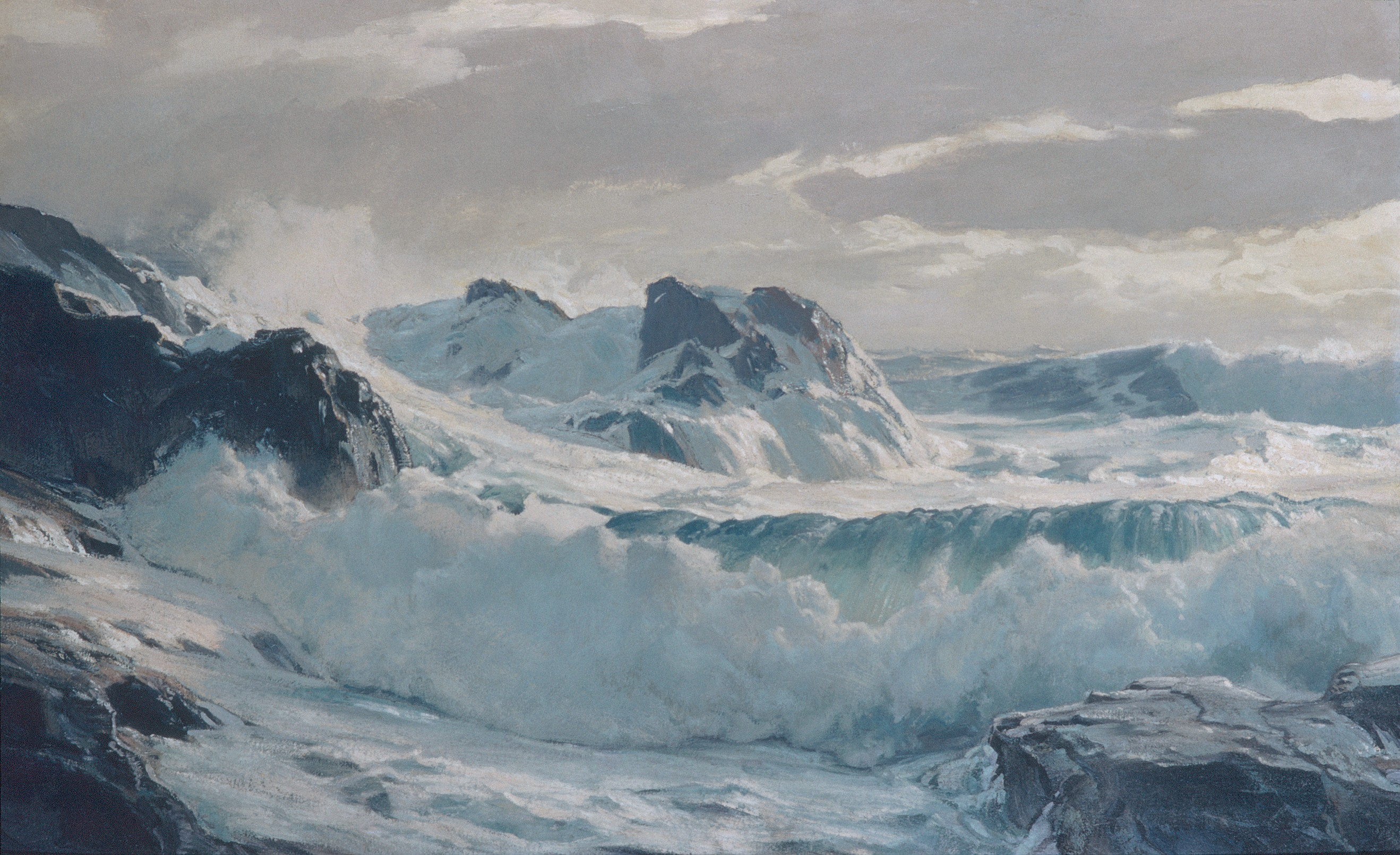
- Year: c. 1930
- Medium: Oil on masonite
- Dimensions: 75.9 cm × 122.2 cm (29.9 in × 48.1 in)
- Location: Metropolitan Museum of Art

Wild Weather is an oil on masonite painting by American artist Frederick Judd Waugh. The work depicts waves crashing over stark rock formations, and along with Roaring Forties is one of two seascapes by Waugh on display at the Metropolitan Museum of Art. Waugh recorded his palette for his marine paintings as: permalba white, the cadmiums, alizarin, cerulean blue, cobalt blue, ultramarine blue, viridian, raw sienna, burnt sienna and ivory black.
