= Villa Cook =

House by Le Corbusier in Boulogne-sur-Seine, France

General information
- Location: France
- Address: 6 rue Denfert Rochereau; Boulogne-sur-Seine
- Coordinates: 48.8472°N 2.2425°E
- Completed: 1924
- Owner: William E. Cook

Design and construction
- Architect(s): Le Corbusier

Villa Cook or Maison Cook is a house built by the noted architect Le Corbusier, located in Boulogne-sur-Seine, France.

== History of the commission ==
William Edwards Cook's father died in 1924, at which time he became an heir (along with a sister and two brothers) to a substantial amount of money. In connection with the settlement of his parents' estate, as well as to enable his wife to get to know his relatives (and vice versa), the Cooks drove across the U.S., from east to west and back again, during a period of about five months in 1925, staying for one month in his Iowa hometown. Returning to Europe, they decided to permanently settle in France.

The sculptor Jacques Lipchitz introduced them to architect Le Corbusier, then largely unknown, who, during this time, was designing a series of villas, including innovative homes for Michael Stein (Gertrude's brother) and Lipchitz himself. In 1926, they commissioned the architect to design what Le Corbusier said was the first "true cubic house," called Villa Cook or Maison Cook, on the outskirts of Paris.
