= Roaring Forties (Frederick Judd Waugh) =

Painting by Frederick Judd Waugh

The Roaring Forties
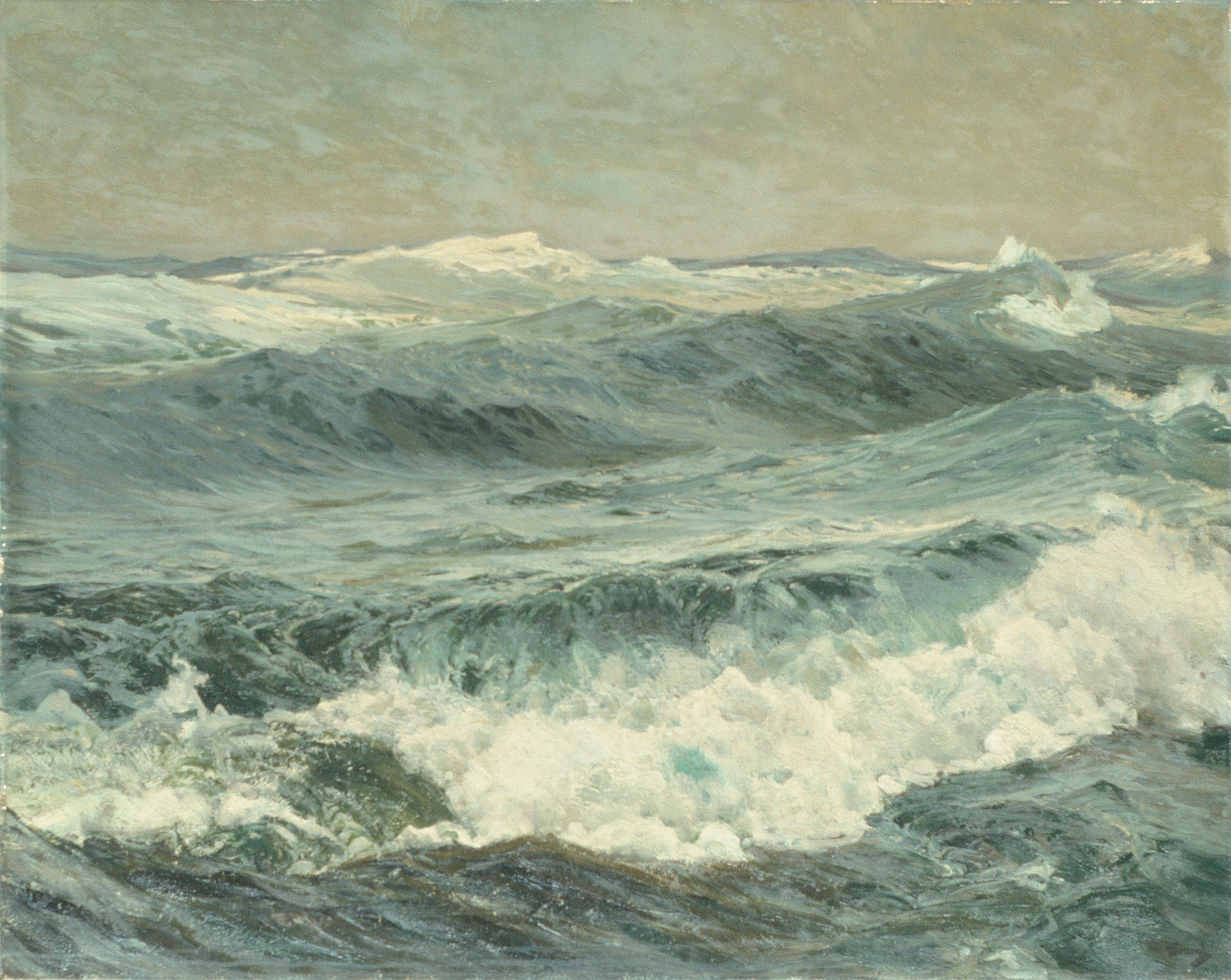
- Year: 1908
- Medium: Oil on canvas
- Dimensions: 121.9 cm × 152.7 cm (48.0 in × 60.1 in)
- Location: Metropolitan Museum of Art

The Roaring Forties is a 1908 oil painting by Frederick Judd Waugh. The painting depicts a turbulent seascape in the Roaring Forties, the part of the Southern Hemispheric Ocean between the latitudes of 40 and 50 degrees famed for its dangerous storms. Along with Wild Weather, the work is one of two seascape paintings by Waugh on display at the Metropolitan Museum of Art.
