= F. F. Mackay =

American actor and manager

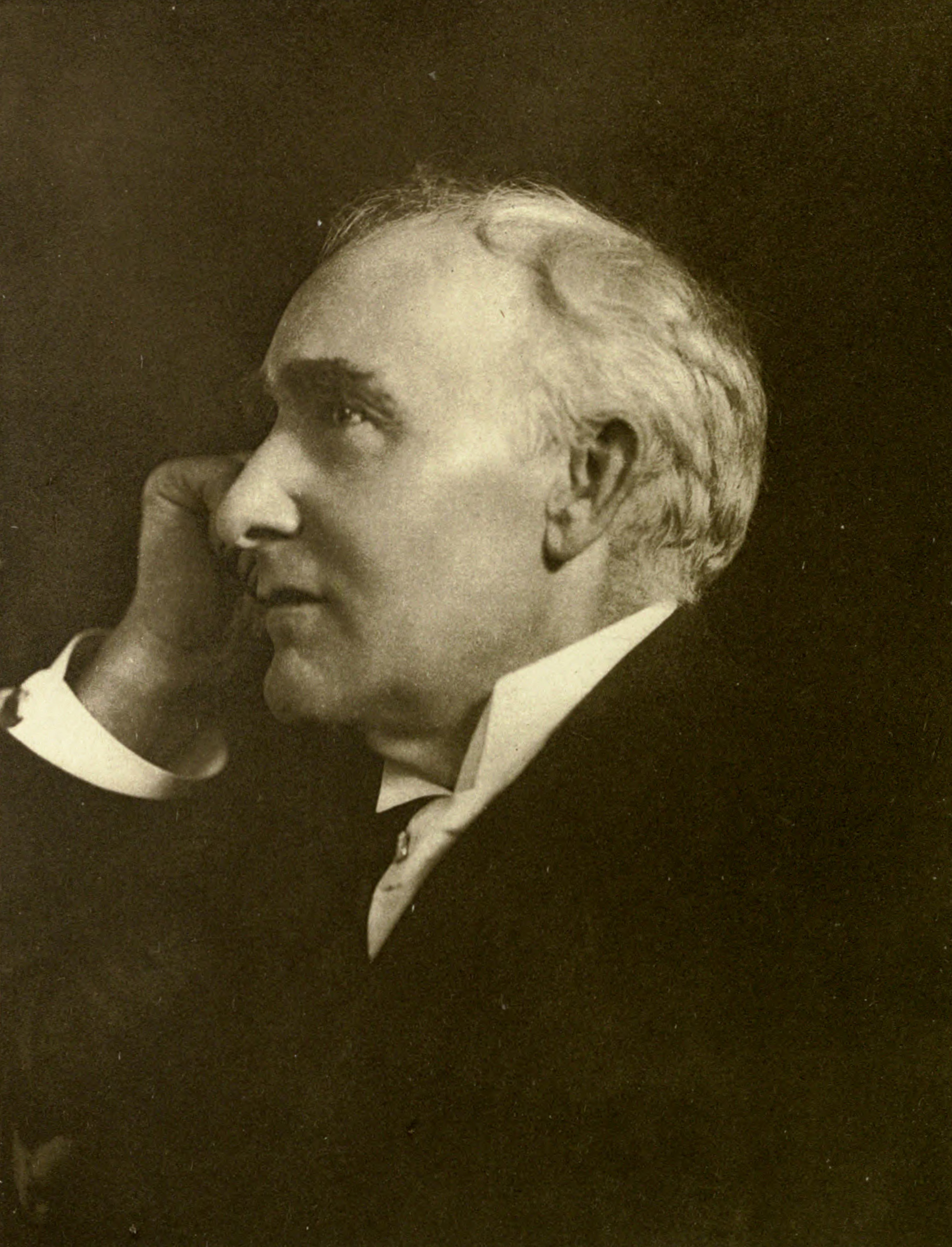
- Born: Frank Findley Mackay; July 20, 1832; Upper Canada
- Died: May 6, 1923 (aged 90); Fort Lee, New Jersey, U.S.
- Spouse: Elizabeth Sneathan
- Children: 3

Frank Findley Mackay (July 20, 1832 – May 6, 1923) was an American actor and author. He was vice president and the chairman of the executive committee of the Actors Fund of America. He was the founder of the National Congress of Dramatic Art.

== Biography ==
Mackay was born on July 20, 1832, in Upper Canada (now Ontario, Canada) to Francie Mackay and Elizabeth Findley of Scotland. His parents had migrated from Scotland to New York City but fled the city for Canada during the cholera epidemic of 1832. He started in theater in 1848 at the Arch Street repertory theatre in Philadelphia, Pennsylvania.

In 1863, he married Elizabeth J. Sneathan and they had three children, Charles Donald, Edward, and William Andrew Mackay.

In 1913, he wrote The Art of Acting. In 1916 he was commemorated as the oldest living Broadway actor.

He died on May 6, 1923, in Fort Lee, New Jersey, at the home of his son, Charles.
