= William Mackay (artist) =

American painter

Ceiling Mural. Library of Congress Thomas Jefferson Building

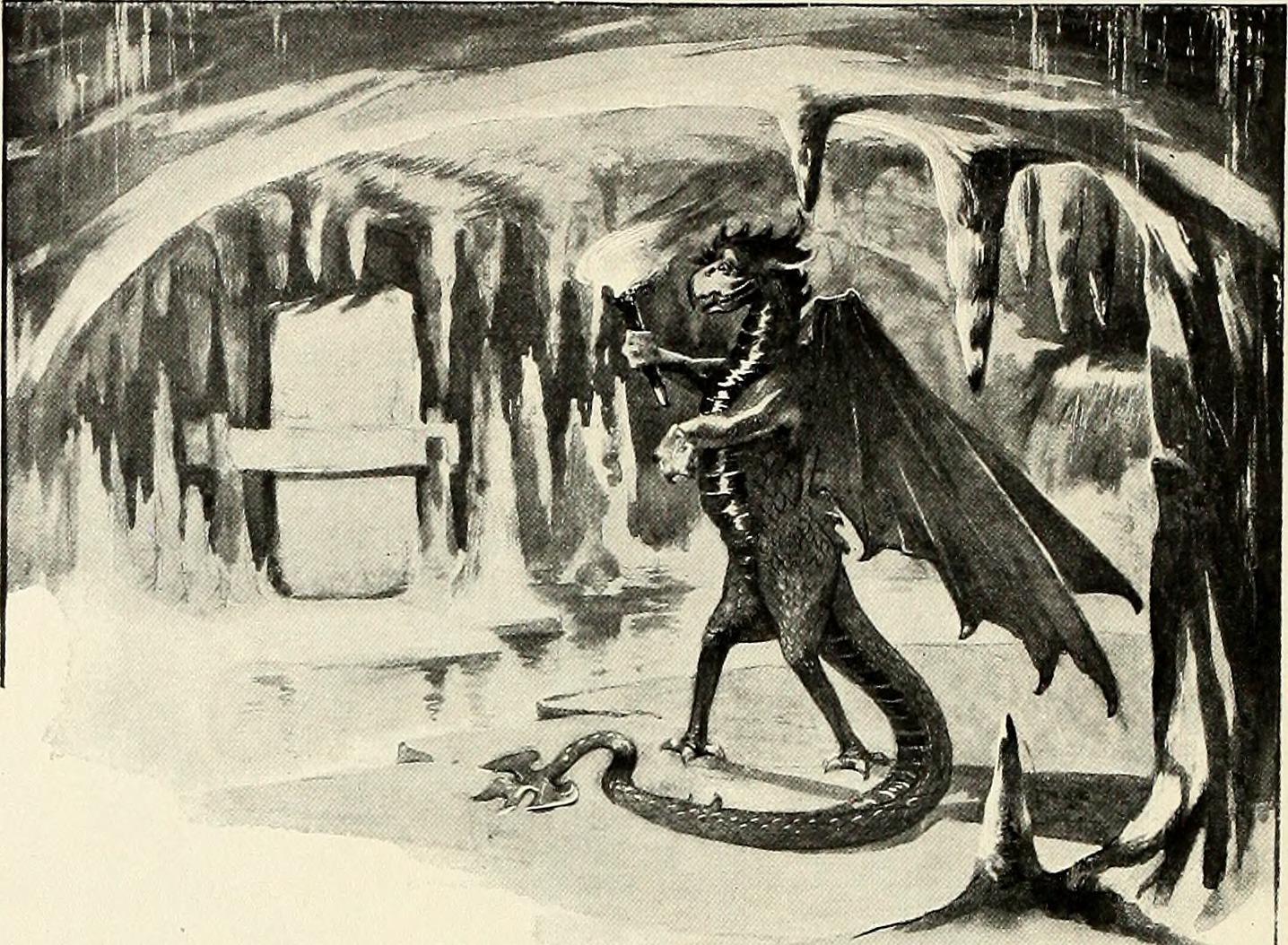
St. Nicholas (serial) (1873)

William Andrew Mackay (1876 - July 26, 1939) was an American artist who created a series of murals about the achievements of Theodore Roosevelt. Those three murals, completed in 1936, were installed beneath the rotunda in the Roosevelt Memorial Hall of the American Museum of Natural History in New York. Less known but also important, he was a major contributor to the development of ship camouflage in the United States during World War I.

== Biography ==
Mackay was born in 1876 in Philadelphia to Elizabeth J. and Frank F. Mackay. After high school, he studied at the City College of New York, the Académie Julian in Paris, and the American Academy in Rome. As a muralist, he completed projects for the Library of Congress, the American Museum of Natural History, the Minnesota State House of Representatives, and other locations.

=== Ship Camouflage ===
Mackay played a major role in the development of U.S. ship camouflage during World War I, although there are conflicting accounts of the extent of his contributions. According to one report, he experimented with low visibility ship camouflage as early as 1913 (Perry 1919, pp. 138–139). In that source, he is said to have painted a vessel with red, green and violet splotches (not unlike a Pointillist painting), with the result that, when viewed from a distance, the ship appeared “to melt into sea and sky,” making it less visible than if it had been painted with a flat “battleship gray,” as had been the earlier practice.

A later account describes Mackay’s testimony in 1917 at a meeting of the U.S. Navy Consulting Board in Washington D.C. (Crowell 1921, p. 496). In that presentation, he used a toy-like spinning device to demonstrate the visual effects of one or more rotating colored disks (comparable to Maxwell’s disks). One of these disks had been painted with equal components of red, violet and green, while another had green and violet sectors. When the disks were spun, the former appeared as an indistinct gray, while the second produced the appearance of a color described as “the blue of sea water.” On the basis of these demonstrations, Mackay argued (as he had in 1913) that low visibility hues could result when red, green and violet colors were viewed from a sufficient distance.

After the U.S. entered World War I in 1917, a scheme devised by Mackay was one of five camouflage “measures” approved by the U.S. Navy Consulting Board for official use on merchant ships. His proposal was subsequently patented in 1919, as U.S. Patent No. 1,305,296, titled “Process of Rendering Objects Less Visible Against Backgrounds.” During World War I, he also served as the head of the camouflage section of the New York District of the Emergency Fleet Corporation, for which he supervised the artists who applied camouflage patterns to merchant ships in that district’s harbors (Warner 1919).

One of the artists who worked with Mackay during World War I was John D. Whiting, who wrote a semi-fictional book about his own wartime experiences (Whiting 1928), in which it is said that Mackay started a camouflage training school, and published a Handbook on Ship Camouflage in 1937.

=== Death ===
He died on July 26, 1939, of a heart attack on a subway train at 125th Street and Broadway.

== See also ==
- Dazzle camouflage
- Everett Warner
