= Loyd A. Jones =

Loyd Ancile Jones
- Born: April 12, 1884; York, Nebraska
- Died: May 15, 1954 (aged 70)
- Education: University of Nebraska (BS, 1908, MS, 1910, Honorary Doctorate, 1933)
- Awards: Frederic Ives Medal (1943); Progress Medal of the Royal Photographic Society (1948)
- Scientific career
- Fields: Physics
- Workplaces: U.S. Bureau of Standards; Eastman Kodak Company

Loyd Ancile Jones (April 12, 1884 – May 15, 1954) was an American scientist who worked for Eastman Kodak Company, where he was head of its physics department for many years. During World War I, he was also a major contributor to the development of naval camouflage.

== Background ==
He was born Loyd Ancile Jones in York, Nebraska. He was educated at the University of Nebraska, where he received a bachelor's degree in 1908 and master's degree in science in 1910. He was also awarded an honorary doctorate from the University of Rochester in 1933.

== Career ==
Following graduate school, Jones moved to Washington D.C., where he worked for several years as a laboratory assistant at the U.S. Bureau of Standards doing research in photometry, colorimetry, spectro-photometry, spectroscopy, and retinal sensitivity. In 1912, he joined the scientific research staff at Eastman Kodak Company, where he became chief physicist in 1916, a position he continued in until his retirement (Behrens 2009, p. 201). His research at Eastman Kodak generally related to the subject of sensitometry.

== Camouflage Research ==
When the U.S. became involved in World War I, George Eastman offered to the U.S. Navy the expertise of Jones (who served in the U.S. Naval Reserves) and others for the purpose of researching naval camouflage in relation to optics and physics (Ackerman 1930, p. 310). Other people at the time argued that visual artists would be better equipped than scientists to develop camouflage. A compromise solution was reached, and on March 25, 1918, architect Harold Van Buskirk was placed in charge of a U.S. Navy camouflage unit, consisting of two major sections: A design section made up of artists, located in Washington D.C., headed by artist Everett L. Warner; and a research section made up largely of scientists, located at the Eastman laboratories in Rochester, New York, under the supervision of Jones (Van Buskirk 1919; Warner 1919).

In connection with his research of naval camouflage, Jones and his staff developed in the laboratory an “experimental ocean,” which used an observation tank, artificial sun, movable sky, and other components that simulated outdoor viewing conditions, as miniature camouflaged ships were observed through a submarine periscope. He also developed an outdoor observation stage on the shore of Lake Ontario. Painted cut-out silhouettes of camouflaged ships were suspended from a framework, at a height that made the ships appear to be floating on the water (Jones 1919; Skerrett 1919; Scientific American 1919).

== Inventions ==
Jones was a prolific inventor. He was responsible for at least eighteen registered patents, and authored dozens of articles on such subjects as photometry, physical optics, illuminating engineering, colorimetry, photography and motion pictures. One of his wartime inventions was a scope-like observation device called a visibility meter (U.S. Patent No. 1,437,809), which measured a ship’s visibility in an ocean setting (Ackerman 1930).

== Distinctions ==
Jones served as President of the Optical Society of America (OSA) from 1930 to 1931, and as President of the Society of Motion Picture Engineers from 1924 to 1925. In 1943, he was awarded the Frederic Ives Medal by the Optical Society of America and he received the Progress Medal of the Royal Photographic Society (RPS) in 1948.

== See also ==
- Camouflage
- Everett L. Warner
- Harold Van Buskirk
- George Eastman
- Eastman Kodak
- Optical Society of America
