= Harold Van Buskirk =

American fencer

Personal information
- Born: February 20, 1894 Brooklyn, New York, United States
- Died: October 25, 1980 (aged 86) Harris County, Texas, United States

Sport
- Sport: Fencing
- College team: University of Pennsylvania Quakers

Harold Van Buskirk (February 20, 1894 – October 25, 1980) was an American architect and fencing champion, and a three-time member of the US Olympic fencing team. During World War I, he was the officer in charge of the US Navy Camouflage Section, which designed and tested camouflage for American ships, both military and civilian (Van Buskirk 1919).

== Early years ==
Born in Brooklyn, New York, his birth name was Charles Harold Van Buskirk. He attended college at the University of Pennsylvania, where he earned a BS in architecture in 1915, and fenced for the University of Pennsylvania Quakers.

== Camouflage service ==
During World War I, Van Buskirk was a lieutenant in the US Naval Reserve Force. Initially connected with the Submarine Defense Association, in March 1918 he was put in charge of the Camouflage Section, a newly formed government unit within the Bureau of Construction and Repair (Skerrett 1919:101). The Camouflage Section had two subsections, the Design Subsection (located in Washington DC) and the Research Subsection (located at Eastman Kodak Laboratories in Rochester, New York). The former, which was largely made up of artists, was led by a painter named Everett L. Warner, while the latter, whose members where mostly scientists, was under the direction of Eastman Kodak's head physicist, Loyd A. Jones (Warner 1919:105-106). Van Buskirk was the executive head of the two subsections, which included making certain that the patterns produced by these units were being correctly adapted to merchant ships by civilian painters. The task of commissioning painters to apply dazzle camouflage patterns to the ships was given to a civilian agency, the Emergency Fleet Corporation (Van Buskirk 1919:227).

== Fencing career ==
Van Buskirk's skills as a fencer led to his being a member of the US Olympic fencing team in 1924, 1928 and 1932, competing with the sabre. In 1927, he was the US National Champion with the épée. His wife Evelyn was also a fencing champion. In 1944, the Van Buskirks moved to Houston, Texas, where he was a coach and instructor of fencing at Rice University for more than twenty years, and where, in 1968, the Van Buskirk Sabre Tournament was established. A member of the US Fencing Association (USFA) Hall of Fame, he died in Harris County, Texas, in 1980.

== See also ==
- USFA Hall of Fame
- Dazzle camouflage
- Everett Warner
- Loyd A. Jones
- William Mackay
- List of USFA Division I National Champions

== Notes ==
- Everett L. Warner, “Fooling the Iron Fish: The Inside Story of Marine Camouflage” in Everybody’s Magazine (November 1919), pp. 102–109.
- Robert G. Skerrett, “How We Put It Over on the Periscope” in The Rudder (March 1919), pp. 97–102; (April 1919), pp. 175–179.
- Harold Van Buskirk, “Camouflage” in Transactions of the Illuminating Engineering Society 14 (July 21, 1919), pp. 225–232.
