= Roy Behrens =

American artist (born 1946)

- Born: Roy Richard Behrens; 1946 (age 79–80); Independence, Iowa, U.S.

Academic background
- Education: University of Northern Iowa (BA); Rhode Island School of Design (MA)

Academic work
- Discipline: Art
- Sub-discipline: Camouflage
- Institutions: University of Northern Iowa; University of Wisconsin–Milwaukee; Art Academy of Cincinnati

Roy Richard Behrens (/ˈbɛərənz/; born 1946) is an American artist and academic who is an emeritus professor of art and distinguished scholar at the University of Northern Iowa. He is well known for his writings on camouflage in relation to art, design and creativity as detailed in False Colors, Camoupedia, Ship Shape and additional books and essays on the subject.

== Early life and education ==
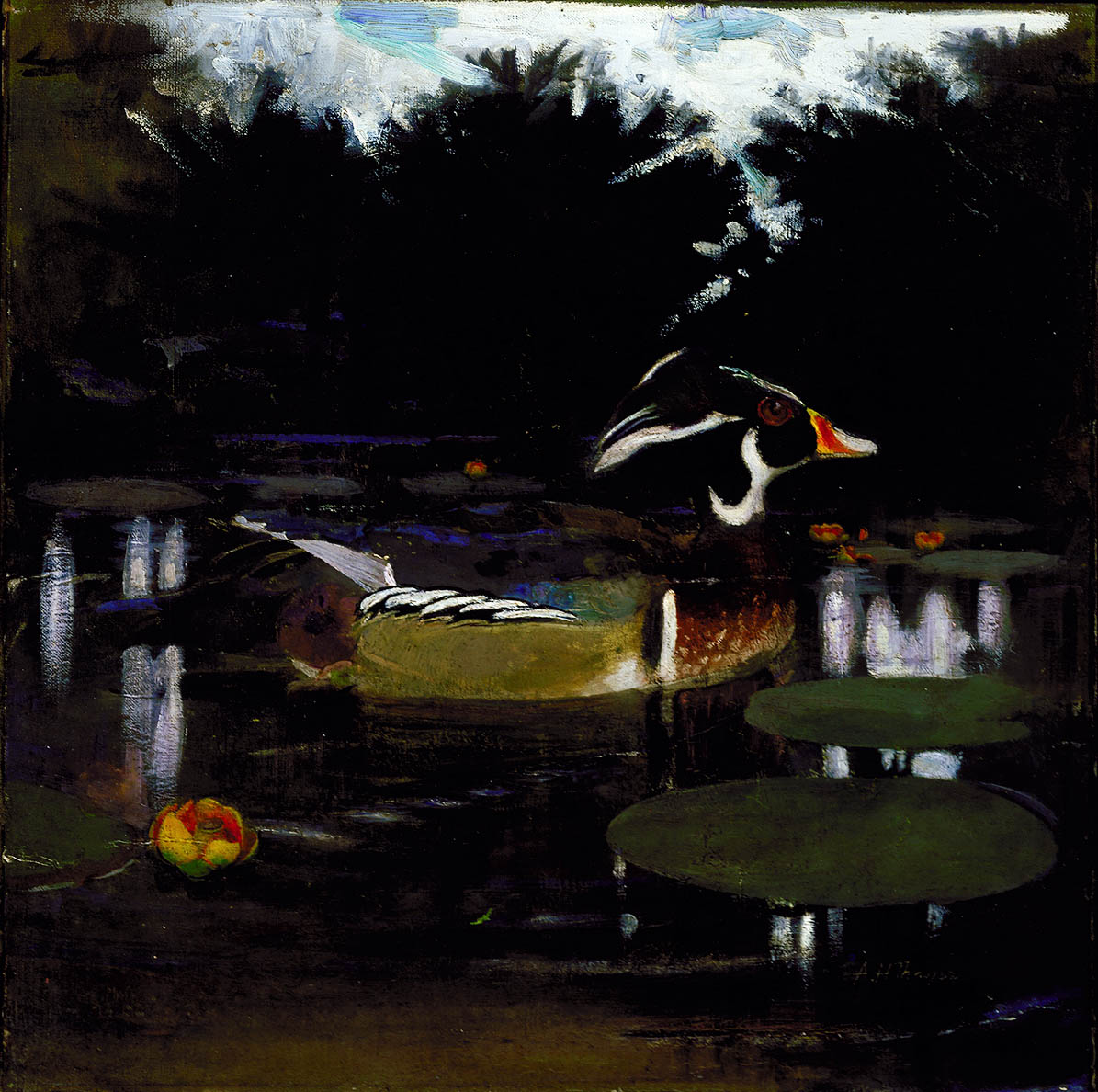
Behrens has written extensively on the interface between camouflage and art, including on the theories of the artist Abbott Handerson Thayer, who argued that the male wood duck's conspicuous plumage was disruptively patterned, rather than sexually selected. (Painting Male Wood Duck in a Forest Pool by Thayer, 1909)

Behrens was born in Independence, Iowa. Following high school, he studied for a summer in California with Master Potter Marguerite Wildenhain, who had been a student in 1919 at the Bauhaus in Weimar, Germany. He earned a Bachelor of Arts degree in art education from the University of Northern Iowa in 1968 and a Master of Arts in art education from the Rhode Island School of Design in 1972.

== Career ==
Behrens served in the United States Marine Corps 1969 to 1971, rising to the rank of sergeant.

He taught graphic design, illustration, and design history at the University of Northern Iowa, the University of Wisconsin–Milwaukee, the Art Academy of Cincinnati. He has written several books and numerous papers. For twenty years, beginning in 1985, he published a quarterly magazine called Ballast Quarterly Review (the title is an acronym for Books Art Language Logic Ambiguity Science and Teaching), self-described as a "periodical commonplace book." Over the years, he has written numerous articles for Leonardo and for various books, encyclopedias and journals.

He is the author of Camoupedia, (Note: Not the same as the military camouflage pattern website, Camopedia.) a book and blog on camouflage. The camouflage researcher Isla Forsyth describes this work as an "extensive study into modern military camouflage..by the British and US military throughout the First and Second World Wars, exploring the contribution of art and science, and the ways in which, via modern and contemporary art, camouflage has been appropriated by contemporary culture". Mike Leggett, reviewing the book in Leonardo, wrote that "the outcome of enthusiastic research it is, but an entertaining summary of the field it also manages to be." Michael Martone calls Behrens "a wonderful writer and artist ... whose work on camouflage and art is important to me. He publishes an amazing 'zine called Ballast on visual and verbal punning."

== Personal life ==
Behrens is married to the artist Mary Snyder Behrens, with whom he is founder and co-proprietor of Bobolink Books.

== Works ==
=== Books ===
- (1977) (with Jerome Klinkowitz) The life of fiction. University of Illinois Press. ISBN 978-0252006432.
- (1981) Art & camouflage: Concealment and deception in nature, art and war. North American Review / University of Northern Iowa. ISBN 978-0915996070.
- (1984) Design in the visual arts. Prentice-Hall. ISBN 978-0132019477.
- (1986) Illustration as an art. Prentice-Hall. ISBN 978-0134514284.
- (2002) False colors: Art, design and modern camouflage. Bobolink Books. ISBN 978-0971324404.
- (2005) Cook book: Gertrude Stein, William Cook and Le Corbusier. Bobolink Books. ISBN 978-0971324411.
- (2009) Camoupedia: A compendium of research on art, architecture, and camouflage. Bobolink Books. ISBN 978-0971324466.
- (2012) Ship shape: a dazzle camouflage sourcebook. Bobolink Books. ISBN 978-0971324473.
- (2016) Frank Lloyd Wright and Mason City: Architectural heart of the prairie. History Press. ISBN 978-1467118606.

=== Selected essays ===
- (1987) “The life and unusual ideas of Adelbert Ames Jr.” Leonardo (MIT Press). Vol 20 No 3, pp. 273–279.
- (1988) “The theories of Abbott H. Thayer: father of camouflage” Leonardo (MIT Press). Vol 21 No 3, pp. 291–296.
- (1994) “Adelbert Ames and the cockeyed room” Print (New York). Vol 48 No 2 (March / April), pp. 92–97.
- (1997) “The gift of gabberjabbs” Print (New York). Vol 51 No 1, pp. 64–72. Full text online
- (1998) “The artistic and scientific collaboration of Blanche Ames Ames and Adelbert Ames II” Leonardo (MIT Press). Vol 31 No 1, pp. 47–54.
- (1998) “On Max Wertheimer and Pablo Picasso: gestalt theory, cubism and camouflage” Gestalt Theory: Journal of the GTA (Vienna). Vol 20 No 2, pp. 109–118. Full text online
- (1998) “Rudolf Arnheim: The little owl on the shoulder of Athene” Leonardo (MIT Press). Vol 31 No 3, pp. 231–233.
- (1998) “Art, design and gestalt theory”” Leonardo (MIT Press). Vol 31 No 4, pp. 299-303.
- (1999) “Adelbert Ames, Fritz Heider and the Ames chair demonstration” Gestalt Theory: Journal of the GTA (Vienna). Vol 21 No 3.
- (1999) “The role of artists in ship camouflage during World War I” Leonardo (MIT Press). Vol 32 No 4, pp. 53–59.
- (2000) “Revisiting Gottschaldt: embedded figures in art, architecture and design” Gestalt Theory: Journal of the GTA (Vienna). Vol 22 No 2, pp. 97–106. Full text online
- (2002) “How form functions: on esthetics and gestalt theory” Gestalt Theory: Journal of the GTA (Vienna). Vol 24 No 4, pp. 317–325. Full text online
- (2005) “Architecture, art and camouflage” Lotus International (Italy). Issue 126, pp. 74–83.
- (2010) “Ames demonstrations in perception” in E. Bruce Goldstein, ed., Encyclopedia of perception. Vol 1. Sage Publications, pp. 41–44. ISBN 978-1412940818.
- (2010) “Camouflage” in E. Bruce Goldstein, ed., Encyclopedia of perception. Vol 1. Sage Publications, pp. 233–236. ISBN 978-1412940818.
- (2011) “Nature’s artistry: Abbott H. Thayer’s assertions about camouflage in art, war and zoology” in Martin Stevens and Sami Merilaita, eds., Animal camouflage: Mechanisms and function. Oxford University Press. ISBN 978-0521152570.
- (2013) “Now you see it, now you don’t: camoufleurs, conjurers and pickpockets” in H. Rothstein and B. Whaley, eds. The art and science of military deception. Artech House. pp. 217–237. ISBN 978-1608075515.
- (2013) “Art, design and brain research: non-scientific thoughts about neuroesthetics” in Gestalt Theory: Journal of the GTA (Vienna) Vol 35 No 2 pp. 169–182.
- (2014) “Abbott H. Thayer’s vanishing ducks: surveillance, art and camouflage” in MAS Context (Chicago) 22, pp. 164–177. Full text online
- (2015) “Khaki to khaki (dust to dust): the ubiquity of camouflage in human experience” in Ann Elias et al., eds., Camouflage cultures: beyond the art of disappearance. Sydney University Press. ISBN 978-1743324257.
- (2016) “Setting the stage for deception: perspective distortion in World War I camouflage” Aisthesis: Pratiche, linguaggi e saperi dell’estetico (Firenze, Italy). Full text online
- (2017) “Camouflage” in Viction Workshop, Camo mania: New disruptive patterns in design. Victionary, pp. 209–222. ISBN 978-9887774648.
- (2018) “Seeing through camouflage: Abbott Thayer, background-picturing and the use of cut-out silhouettes” Leonardo (MIT Press). Vol 51 No 1, pp. 41–46.
- (2018) “Chicanery and conspicuousness: social repercussions of World War I camouflage” UNIversitas (University of Northern Iowa) Vol 13. Full text online
- (2018) "Under the big top at Sims' circus: ship camouflage behind the scenes in World War I" Bobolink Books Full text online
- (2018) "Disruption versus dazzle: prevalent misunderstandings about World War I ship camouflage" Bobolink Books Full text online
- (2019) "Optical science meets visual art: the camouflage experiments of William Andrew Mackay." Bobolink Books Full text online
- (2019) "Ship shapes" in Patek Philippe: The International Magazine. (Geneva, Switzerland) Vol 4 No 7, pp. 10–15.
- (2020) "Simpatico on the patio: emphatic art, mimicry, and camouflage" in Susanne Bürner, ed., Mimicry-Empathy. Berlin, Germany: Monroe Books, pp. 158-171 Full text online
- (2020) "Bewilderness: James Joyce and the National Parks" Bobolink Books Full text online
- (2020) "Mason City’s prairie gems—and how Australians found them" in The Iowa Source. July Full text online
- (2020) "Buffalo Bill in Iowa: tales of a western folk hero—and his doppelganger" in The Iowa Source. August Full text online
- (2020) "Honoring Navajo traditions: chronicles of an immersive education in New Mexico" in The Iowa Source, November Full text online
- (2020) "Nature Boy: the enchanted life of Eden Ahbez" in The Iowa Source. December Full text online
- (2021) "The Corn Parade: Orr Fisher’s wacky WPA mural" in The Iowa Source. January Full text online
- (2021) "The camoufleur: Carol Sax, Ottumwa’s dazzling designer" in The Iowa Source. February Full text online
- (2021) "Old Fort Atkinson: My family’s brief occupation of an army outpost" in The Iowa Source. June Full text online
- (2021) "Tea and frankfurters: the story of Gertrude Kasëbier’s Portraits of the Lakota Sioux" in The Iowa Source. July Full text online
- (2021) "The Hubbards of Roycroft: an arts and crafts community with Iowa ties" in The Iowa Source (Fairfield IA), August Full text online
- (2021) "Artist Clemens Gretter: Robert Ripley’s ghost" in The Iowa Source. October Full text online
- (2021) "A Tale of Twain Wives: Mark Twain, Albert Paine, and klecksography" in The Iowa Source. December Full text online
- (2021) "Pandemic Images and Gestalt Theory: introspective musings about a series of digital artworks" in Gestalt Theory. Volume 43 Number 3 Full text online
- (2022) "Oscar Wilde, Whiskey, and the Peacock Room" in The Iowa Source. January Full text online
- (2022) "Gertrude Stein: the author’s fondness for her Iowa friends" in The Iowa Source. February Full text online
- (2022) "Allen Ginsberg in Cedar Falls: beatniks, socialists, and 'all that hair'" in The Iowa Source. March Full text online
- (2022) "Paintings in Sand: the meticulous work of Andrew Clemens" in The Iowa Source. June Full text online
- (2023) "Looming Large: the outdoor mega sculpture student projects of Bill Close" in The Iowa Source. January Full text online
- (2023) "Stories of Sarah Royce: from Stratford-upon-Avon to Tipton, Iowa, and beyond" in The Iowa Source. September Full text online
- (2023) "Did Artist Meet Architect? Grant Wood and Frank Lloyd Wright in Iowa City" in The Iowa Source. November Full text online
- (2024) "MacKinlay Kantor: the tangled past of a once-famous author" in The Iowa Source. January Full text online
- (2024) "Ralph Waldo Emerson in Iowa: when the popular essayist walked on water" in The Iowa Source. March Full text online
- (2024) "William Cary Wright: Looking for Frank Lloyd Wright’s Father" in The Iowa Source. June Full text online
- (2024) "Walter Hamady, Papermaking Champion, 1940-2019" on Hall of Champions, North American Hand Papermakers. July Full text online
- (2024) "Horse-Racing Pooh-Bah: C.W. Williams and his Kite-Shaped Track" in The Iowa Source. July Full text online
- (2024) "British-American Artist Frederick A. Pawla: His Achievements in Ship Camouflage during World War I" Bobolink Books Full text online
- (2024) "An Iowa artist's adventures with the Lost Generation in Paris: The enduring friendship of William Edwards Cook and Gertrude Stein" in Iowa History Journal. July-August Online link

=== Online films ===
- (2021) Nature, Art, and Camouflage Bobolink Books Full online access
- (2021) Art, Women's Rights, and Camouflage Bobolink Books Full online access
- (2021) Embedded Figures, Art, and Camouflage Bobolink Books Full online access
- (2021) Art, Gestalt, and Camouflage Bobolink Books Full online access
- (2022) Dazzle Camouflage: what is it and how did it work? Interview Full online access
- (2022) Cook: the man who taught Gertrude Stein how to drive Bobolink Books Full online access
- (2022) Solving Problems in Design Bobolink Books Full online access
- (2022) Dreams of Fields: Salvador Dali’s encounter with corn Bobolink Books Full online access
- (2022) Bauhaus, Gestalt Theory, and Problem-Solving: thinking outside the box Bobolink Books Full online access
- (2022) Ames and Anamorphosis: the man who made distorted rooms (Part One) Bobolink Books Full online access
- (2022) Ames and Anamorphosis: the man who made distorted rooms (Part Two) Bobolink Books Full online access
- (2022) Ames and Anamorphosis: the man who made distorted rooms (Part Three) Bobolink Books Full online access
- (2022) On Saying Something and Saying It Well: a talk by poet Joseph Langland Bobolink Books Full online access
- (2022) How to Win Kings and Influence Cabbages: the process by which creativity works Bobolink Books Full online access
- (2023) Art, Design and Gestalt Theory: the film version Bobolink Books Full online access
- (2023) Book Art: Walter Hamady’s books, collages and assemblages Bobolink Books Full online access

=== Selected exhibitions ===
- (2001) Modern Design Icons: 20th century graphic, industrial, and architectural design at Gallery of Art, University of Northern Iowa (Cedar Falls IA). August 27 through September 21
- (2010) Seagoing Easter Eggs: artists' contributions to dazzle ship camouflage at Convergys Gallery, Art Academy of Cincinnati (Cincinnati OH). January 15 through February 12
- (2017-18) Razzle Dazzle: World War I ship camouflage at Dubuque Museum of Art (Dubuque IA). November 3 through February 4 Online link
- (2017-18) Hidden Figures: the role of American women in World War I camouflage at Betty Strong Encounter Center / Lewis and Clark Interpretive Center (Sioux City IA). November 12 through June 3 Online link
- (2018) Assembly: the work of dazzle camouflage at Hearst Center for the Arts (Cedar Falls IA). October 5 through November 25
- (2018) Animal Forms and Patterns at Hartman Reserve Nature Center (Cedar Falls IA). November through December Online link
- (2019) National Parks and Monuments Posters at Hartman Reserve Nature Center (Cedar Falls IA). March through April Online link
- (2019) Hartman Nature Posters: Part One at Hartman Reserve Nature Center (Cedar Falls IA). May through June Online link
- (2019) Hartman Nature Posters: Part Two at Hartman Reserve Nature Center (Cedar Falls IA). July through August Online link
- (2019) Hartman Nature Posters: Part Three at Hartman Reserve Nature Center (Cedar Falls IA). September through October Online link
- (2019) Hartman Nature Posters: Part Four at Hartman Reserve Nature Center (Cedar Falls IA). November through December Online link
- (2022) Pandemic Montages: a series of digital stories at Hearst Center for the Arts (Cedar Falls IA). January 6 through February 20 Online link
- (2022) Evolving Graphic Design Exhibition at University of Wisconsin-Madison (Madison WI). May 24 through June 24
- (2022) National Parks and Monuments Posters at Jester Park Nature Center (Granger IA). May 1 through August 28
- (2024-ongoing) Iowa Novelist and Short Story Writer Ruth Suckow 1892-1960: an exhibition about her life. Traveling exhibition (designer of) at libraries and history centers in State of Iowa, with funding from Humanities Iowa.
