= Janvier (surname) =

Janvier is a surname from French. Notable people with this surname include:

- Alex Janvier (1935–2024), First Nations painter in Canada
- Ambroise Janvier (1613–1682), French benedictine
- Antide Janvier (1751–1835), French clockmaker
- Bernard Janvier (born 1939), French general
- Caroline Janvier (born 1982), French politician
- Eric Janvier, French businessman
- Louis-Joseph Janvier (1855–1911), Haitian journalist, diplomat and novelist
- Margaret Thomson Janvier (1844–1913), American writer, sister of Thomas
- Marie-Ève Janvier, French Canadian singer
- Maxime Janvier, French tennis player
- Paul Janvier, a pseudonym used by Algis Budrys
- Philippe Janvier, French paleontologist
- Philippe Janvier (actor) (born Jacques Philippe Nugeyre, 1903–1967), French actor
- Thomas Allibone Janvier (1849–1913), American writer and historian, brother of Margaret
- Ulysse-Janvier Robillard (1826–1900), Quebec merchant and political figure

== See also ==
- Janvier (given name), the given name equivalent
- Janvier (disambiguation)
- January, the month called "janvier" in French
