= A Dog of Flanders (disambiguation) =

A Dog of Flanders is an 1872 novel by English author Ouida.

A Dog of Flanders, Dog of Flanders, and The Dog of Flanders may also refer to:

- A Dog of Flanders (1935 film), a film starring Frankie Thomas
- A Dog of Flanders (1959 film), a film starring Donald Crisp and David Ladd
- A Dog of Flanders (1999 film), a film directed by Kevin Brodie
- Dog of Flanders (TV series), a 1975 Japanese animated television series
- The Dog of Flanders, a 1997 Japanese anime film
- Barking Dogs Never Bite, Korean-language title translated as Dog of Flanders, a 2000 South Korean film directed by Bong Joon-ho
