= Wakakusa no Charlotte =

Japanese anime television series

- Screenshot of the main characters
- 若草のシャルロット
- Genre: Historical drama, romance
- Written by: Shun-ichi Yukimoro
- Directed by: Eiji Okabe
- Music by: Hiromasa Suzuki
- Country of origin: Japan
- Original language: Japanese
- No. of episodes: 30

Production
- Producer: Akira Negoro
- Production companies: Nippon Animation; Asahi Broadcasting Corporation

Original release
- Network: ANN (ABC, TV Asahi)
- Release: 29 October 1977 – 27 May 1978

Wakakusa no Charlotte (若草のシャルロット; lit. Charlotte of the Young Grass) is an anime series produced by Nippon Animation Co. Ltd. It was first aired in Japan between October 29, 1977, and May 27, 1978, and is based on an original story by screenwriter Shun'ichi Yukimuro (as opposed to an existing manga).

While this series - Nippon Animation's first to target the shōjo audience, followed by Haikara-san ga Tōru - was taken off the air in Japan early due to mediocre ratings, it is a well-known series in some European countries.

In the Philippines, it was aired by ABS-CBN in 1990s, Yey! in June 2017 and GMA Network in 2000s with some rebroadcasts since then and A2Z Channel, an ABS-CBN blocktime channel in 2021, every weekdays 4 pm (Philippine Standard Time, GMT+8), replacing My Patrasche. It also aired on MBC in South Korea, France on Mangas (TV channel) and La Cinq, Cable Kin in Mexico, America Television in Peru, Super3 in Catalonia and syndication in Italy.

== Plot ==
Charlotte was raised by her father, a former French nobleman, who is now living on a ranch in Quebec, Canada.

Although motherless, Charlotte was a happy girl until her 12th birthday, surrounded by a loving father and many friendly animals. On that day, however, a package arrives from her "mother", who was supposedly dead.

After Charlotte's father dies, this mother comes to live with her. At the same time, Charlotte meets a strange boy. This is only the beginning of many heartbreaking incidents in the girl's life.

== Cast ==
- Ichirô Murakoshi as André Montburn, father of Charlotte who is the founder of a ranch in Quebec, Canada. He died in an accident due to inclement weather while traveling to harbor to meet Charlotte's mother.
- Ichirô Nagai as Grampa
- Kaoru Kurosu as Cassie
- Kazue Komiya as Sammy
- Keiko Yokozawa as Charlotte
- Kôhei Miyauchi as Count
- Osamu Kato as Garcon
- Reiko Suzuki as Bella
- Rokuro Naya as Knight
- Toshiko Shimaki as Becky
- Toshiya Ueda as Jean
- Yasuo Muramatsu as Gordon
- Yoshito Yasuhara as Sandy
- Youko Matsuoka as Jim
- Yūko Mita as Katie

Also in the cast are Simone, mother of Charlotte; Milan, Knight's wicked sister who also hated Charlotte; Albert, Charlotte's wicked uncle; Marie, an adopted daughter of a French nobleman who has a deep hatred to Charlotte; Uncle Melville, an elder companion of Sandy who is fond of watching stars and was elected as a new captain in Charlotte's hometown; and Louis, a sick nobleman who is Marie's fiancée.

== Episode list ==
Episode	Title	Original airdate
1	It happened one birthday	October 29, 1977
2	I don't need a mother	November 5, 1977
3	Go away, bad dreams!	November 12, 1977
4	Spica, the star shining in my heart	November 19, 1977
5	Papa's alive	November 26, 1977
6	Dream carriage from heaven	December 3, 1977
7	Queen of the farm	December 10, 1977
8	Knight in the snow	December 17, 1977
9	A Christmas letter	December 24, 1977
10	Snow festival to usher in spring	January 7, 1978
11	Messenger from Paris	January 14, 1978
12	Little wings on the Atlantic	January 21, 1978
13	The day I'll meet mother	January 28, 1978
14	I hate aristocrats	February 4, 1978
15	The morning I met mother	February 11, 1978
16	Reunion	February 18, 1978
17	75% happiness	February 25, 1978
18	A little fountain in the blaze	March 4, 1978
19	Goodbye to Paris	March 11, 1978
20	Little farm in the middle of the ocean	March 18, 1978
21	Dear old Andre farm	March 25, 1978
22	The light of papa's farm goes out	April 1, 1978
23	My first camping	April 8, 1978
24	Two battles	April 15, 1978
25	News from Flock	April 22, 1978
26	Marie in the sunset	April 29, 1978
27	Papa's ghost	May 6, 1978
28	Mama becomes mayor	May 13, 1978
29	Parting in the flowered woods	May 20, 1978
30	Beautiful May!!!	May 27, 1978

== Music ==
Title	English title	Performer	Description
Wakakusa no Charlotte	Charlotte of the Young Grass	Kumiko Kaori	Opening theme
Mei Furawaa	Mayflower	Kumiko Kaori	Ending theme
