= Yasuo Muramatsu =

Japanese actor and narrator (1933–2024)

- 村松 康雄
- Born: Tamehisa Muramatsu (村松 為久); April 6, 1933; Tokyo Prefecture, Japan
- Died: April 11, 2024 (aged 91); Yokohama, Kanagawa Prefecture, Japan
- Occupations: Actor; voice actor; narrator
- Years active: 1955–2024
- Agent: Office Kaoru
- Spouse: Kaoru Muramatsu (村松薫)
- Website: Official profile

Yasuo Muramatsu (Japanese: 村松 康雄, Hepburn: Muramatsu Yasuo; April 6, 1933 – April 11, 2024) was a Japanese actor, voice actor and narrator. He was a founder of Office Kaoru.

== Biography ==
Muramatsu was born in Tokyo Prefecture on April 6, 1933.

He lived in China during early childhood, but returned to Japan in his first year of junior high school through repatriation following World War II. In China, he received a "forced labor order" from Mao Zedong's army and was tasked to clean up corpses despite only being an elementary school student.

Inspired by a Shiki Theatre Company performance he saw when he was a university student, he joined as a trainee in 1955. Around that time, Keita Asari, the co-founder of the Shiki Theatre Company, was discussing the idea of "starting a company specializing in dubbing" with others at a bar they frequented. It led to the bar’s owner, Banjiro Uemura, founding Tohokushinsha Film. As a result, Muramatsu started appearing in dubbing productions in their early days.

After leaving the theater company, Muramatsu worked as a freelancer for a while. Later, when his younger sister was interviewing Koichi Chiba, she mentioned, "My older brother is also an actor," to which Chiba then invited him to join the same agency, leading to his affiliation with Dōinsha Production starting in 1965. From that point on, voice acting became his major focus.

He became a freelancer in 1988, but after working at Wit Promotion, he officially founded Office Kaoru in 1992.

=== Death ===
In 2024, he was hospitalized due to declining physical strength.

Muramatsu died in Yokohama on April 11 of that same year, at the age of 91, with his wife Kaoru by his side.

== Filmography ==
=== Television animation ===
- Kaibutsu-kun (1968)
- Kamui the Ninja (1969) (Roku)
- Dog of Flanders (1975) (Hans)
- Wakakusa no Charlotte (1977) (Gordon)
- Anne of Green Gables (1979) (John Sadler)
- Gordian Warrior (1979) (Dokuma)
- Doraemon (1980) (Nobirō Nobi, Time Patrol Captain)
- Super Dimension Century Orguss (1983) (Jeffrey Wright)
- Sherlock Hound (1984) (the Frenchman (Ep. 19))
- Princess Sara (1985) (Old Priest)
- The Story of Pollyanna, Girl of Love (1986) (Dr. Charlie Ames)
- My Patrasche (1992) (Reins)
- Ninku (1995) (Seishi Ninku)
- Rurouni Kenshin (1996) (Takuma Hashizume)
- Detective Conan (2000) (Kenzo Masuyama:Pisco)
- Gilgamesh (2003) (The Manager)
- One Piece (2005) (Tom)
- Stitch! (2008) (Teacher (Ep. 20))
- Naruto: Shippuden (2010) (Iou)
- Chaika - The Coffin Princess (2014) (Vemac IV)

=== Original video animation (OVA) ===
- Vampire Hunter D (1985) (Mayor Roman)
- Mobile Suit Gundam 0080: War in the Pocket (1989) (Chris's father)
- Black Jack (1998) (Dr. Stanfield)

=== Theatrical animation ===
- Mobile Suit Gundam (1981) (General Revil)
- Mobile Suit Gundam: Soldiers of Sorrow (1981) (General Revil)
- Mobile Suit Gundam: Encounters in Space (1982) (General Revil)
- Wicked City (1987) (Black Guard President)
- Doraemon: Nobita's Diary of the Creation of the World (1995) (The President)
- Crayon Shin-chan: The Storm Called: The Kasukabe Boys of the Evening Sun (2004) (Mike Mizuno)
- Crayon Shin-chan: Invasion!! Alien Shiriri (2017) (Mike Mizuno)

=== Video games ===
- Gihren no Yabou series (1998–) (General Revil)
- Atelier Annie: Alchemists of Sera Island (2009) (Bethgea)

=== Dubbing ===
==== Live-action ====
- 2012 (Tony Delgotto (George Segal))
- About Schmidt (Larry Hertzel (Howard Hesseman))
- Ace Ventura: Pet Detective (Roger Podacter (Troy Evans))
- Armageddon (Ronald Quincy (Jason Isaacs))
- Assault on Precinct 13 (Sgt. Jasper O'Shea (Brian Dennehy))
- Asteroid (1997 TV Asahi edition) (Lloyd Morgan (Frank McRae))
- Bill & Ted's Bogus Journey (1994 TV Tokyo edition) (Chuck De Nomolos (Joss Ackland))
- The Boston Strangler (1973 TV Asashi edition) (Dr. Nagy (Austin Willis))
- Brawl in Cell Block 99 (The Placid Man (Udo Kier))
- The Cable Guy (Earl Kovacs (George Segal))
- Captain America (Sam Kolawetz (Ned Beatty))
- The Cave (Dr. Nicolai (Marcel Iureş))
- Coupe de Ville (Fred "Pop" Libner (Alan Arkin))
- Dead Silence (Edward Ashen (Bob Gunton))
- DodgeBall: A True Underdog Story (The Dodgeball chancellor (William Shatner))
- Duel (Café owner (Eddie Firestone))
- First Blood (1995 TV Asahi edition) (Deputy Sgt. Arthur Galt (Jack Starrett))
- Flash of Genius (Gregory Lawson (Alan Alda))
- Goldfinger (1978 NTV edition) (Q (Desmond Llewelyn))
- Good Night, and Good Luck (William Paley (Frank Langella))
- The Great Escape (1971 Fuji TV edition) (Lt. Dietrich (George Mikell))
- Grey's Anatomy (Thatcher Grey (Jeff Perry))
- Gulliver's Travels (King Theodore (Billy Connolly))
- Harry Potter and the Deathly Hallows – Part 1 (Elphias Doge (David Ryall))
- Hugo (Monsieur Frick (Richard Griffiths))
- I.Q. (Nathan Liebknecht (Joseph Maher))
- JFK (1994 TV Asashi edition) (Russell B. Long (Walter Matthau))
- Last Action Hero (2001 TV Asahi edition) (Tony Vivaldi (Anthony Quinn))
- Lost (Bernard Nadler (Sam Anderson))
- The Matrix Reloaded (Councillor Hamann (Anthony Zerbe))
- The Matrix Revolutions (Councillor Hamann (Anthony Zerbe))
- Mortdecai (Sir Graham (Michael Culkin))
- National Treasure (Agent Peter Sadusky (Harvey Keitel))
- National Treasure: Book of Secrets (FBI Special Agent Sadusky (Harvey Keitel))
- The Omen (1979 TBS edition) (Dr. Becker (Anthony Nicholls))
- Pathfinder (Pathfinder (Russell Means))
- Pirates of the Caribbean: The Curse of the Black Pearl (Governor Weatherby Swann (Jonathan Pryce))
- Pirates of the Caribbean: At World's End (Governor Weatherby Swann (Jonathan Pryce))
- Quartet (Cedric Livingstone (Michael Gambon))
- Shout at the Devil (1985 TBS edition) (Kapitän zur See Heinrich Graf von Kleine (Karl Michael Vogler))
- Sleepy Hollow (Baltus Van Tassel (Michael Gambon))
- Sonny & Jed (1979 TV Tokyo edition) (Garcia (Eduardo Fajardo))
- Texas, Adios (Pedro (Hugo Blacno))
- Timecop (Commander Eugene Matuzak (Bruce McGill))
- Twin Peaks (Will Hayward (Warren Frost))
- Vertigo (2012 Blu-Ray edition) (Gavin Elster (Tom Helmore))
- The Walking Dead (Hershel Greene (Scott Wilson))
- Wall Street (1991 Fuji TV edition) (Trader (Oliver Stone))
- Wild Wild West (Coleman (M. Emmet Walsh))

==== Animation ====
- Curious George (Mr. Bloomsberry)
- Darkwing Duck (Steelbeak)
- Joseph: King of Dreams (Jacob)
- Prep & Landing ('The Big Guy' Santa Claus)
- ReBoot (Fuji TV edition) (Cyrus)
- Watership Down (Bigwig)
