= A Leaf in the Storm, and Other Stories =

1872 story collection by Ouida

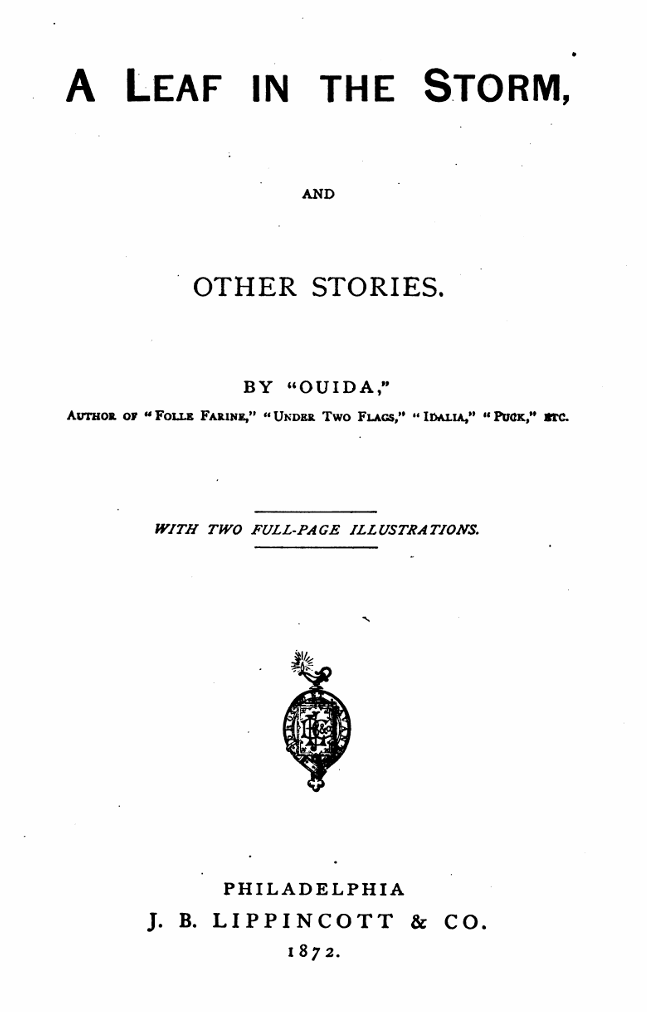
- Title page of the first US edition (1872)
- Author: Marie Louise de la Ramée
- Illustrator: E. B. Bensell (US); Enrico Mazzanti (UK)
- Language: English
- Genre: novellas
- Publisher: Lippincott (US); Chapman & Hall (UK); Tauchnitz (Germany)
- Publication date: 25 January 1872
- Publication place: United States; United Kingdom; Germany
- Media type: Print (Hardback)
- Pages: 99 (US) (Note: Printed in a two-column layout.); 293 (UK, Germany)
- Text: A Leaf in the Storm, and Other Stories at Wikisource

A Leaf in the Storm, and Other Stories is an 1872 collection of tales by English author Marie Louise de la Ramée published under her pseudonym "Ouida". It contains the popular story A Dog of Flanders.

== Background ==
The four novellas were first published in Philadelphia in the Lippincott’s Magazine in 1871, as follows: A Leaf in the Storm (February), A Provence Rose (May–June), A Branch of Lilac (October–November), and A Dog of Flanders (December).

All the first three stories deal with the Prussian invasion of France in July 1870 and with the Paris Commune up to May 1871. "A Leaf in the Storm" was considered so graphically violent that Tauchnitz asked Ouida for permission to produce a censored version, particularly because of its unfavorable depiction of Prussians. Ouida declined the request. In a letter written in Florence on 26 October 1872, she openly expressed her support for France, stating to Tauchnitz: «A Teuton like you and a Latin like me can never possibly view the war in the same light either in its causes or its effects».

== Contents ==
- "A Provence Rose"
- "A Leaf in the Storm"
- "A Dog of Flanders"
- "A Branch of Lilac"

== Publication history ==
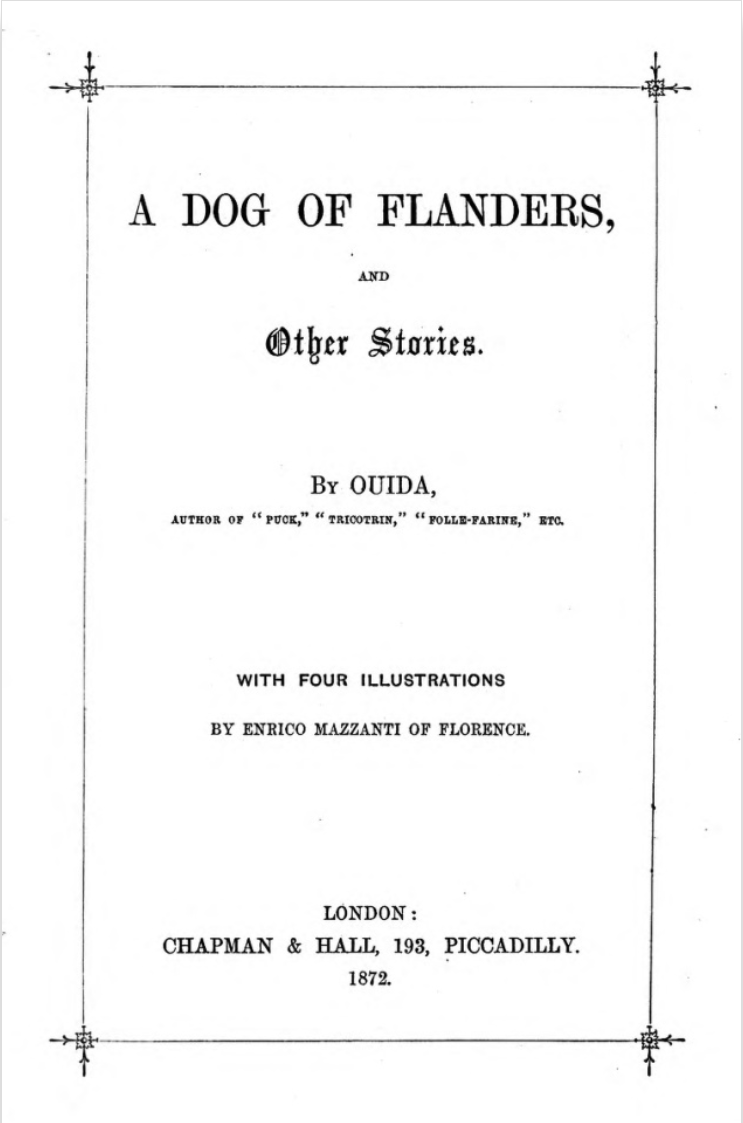
Title page of the first UK edition (1872)

After their magazine publication, the stories were reissued in the volume A Leaf in the Storm, and Other Stories, with two illustrations by E. B. Bensell. It was published by three different houses: Lippincott in Philadelphia on 25 January, Chapman & Hall in London on 27 July, and, also in English, Tauchnitz in Leipzig in December 1872.

The British and German editions appeared under slightly different titles — A Dog of Flanders and Other Stories (Chapman & Hall) and A Leaf in the Storm; A Dog of Flanders; and Other Stories (Tauchnitz) — and arranged the tales in differing orders, placing them as follows: A Dog of Flanders, A Branch of Lilac, A Provence Rose, and A Leaf in the Storm. The UK edition contained four illustrations by Enrico Mazzanti, whereas the German edition was unillustrated.

In 1881, Lippincott reissued the book with the six illustrations by both Bensell and Mazzanti.

In 1893, the collection was republished in the UK by Chatto & Windus and in the US by Lippincott, this time also in America under the title A Dog of Flanders and Other Stories, illustrated by Edmund H. Garrett.

== Reception ==
Overall, the collection in which the stories appeared was received positively by critics and readers alike; the only notable dissent came from the British Pall Mall Gazette, which expressed reservations about the volume, criticizing it for what it perceived as a lack of realism. The Examiner offered a particularly favorable assessment, praising the volume as evidence that the author had «found her soul… in illustrating the great problems of life». Peterson's Magazine wrote: «It is a pity that this author does not always write as she has done in “A Leaf in a Storm,” and “A Dog of Flanders”. It is difficult, indeed, to conceive how the same pen could write these pure, healthful, pathetic tales, and the morbid exaggerations known as the “Ouida” novels».

== Legacy ==
Among the various tales, A Dog of Flanders achieved particular and enduring success worldwide. It was repeatedly reprinted as a standalone novel, became a children's classic in several countries — especially in East Asia — and has been adapted numerous times for film and television.

== Sources ==
- King, Andrew (December 2015). "The Case of Ouida's «A Dog of Flanders» (1871‑Today)" (PDF). English Literature. 2 (2).
