= Edmund Garrett =

Edmund Garrett may refer to:

- Edmund H. Garrett (1853–1929), American illustrator and author, well known for his illustrations of the legends of King Arthur
- Fydell Edmund Garrett (1865–1907), known as Edmund Garrett, British publicist, journalist and poet
