= In the Sargasso Sea =

In the Sargasso Sea is a novel written in 1898 by Thomas Allibone Janvier. Recently, Kessinger Publishing's rare reprints has re-issued the book.

== Plot ==
The protagonist, Roger Stetworth, unwillingly joins a slave ship called the Golden Hind captained by Luke Chilton. (When Chilton demanded that Roger "sign aboard" he refused and was clubbed on the head and thrown overboard.) He is rescued by the Hurst Castle and doctored by a stereotypically depicted Irishman. The Hurst Castle is abandoned but does not founder in a gale, and the crew, unable to get to him, are forced to leave Stetworth marooned aboard. The ship drifts into the center of the Sargasso Sea where Stetworth finds himself in a ships' graveyard in which survivors of previous shipwrecks still inhabit the forgotten ships. Stetworth must rely on his own ingenuity to get free of the choking weeds that fill the sea.
