= Catherine Ann Janvier =

American painter

Catherine A. Janvier
- Born: Catherine Ann Drinker; May 1, 1841; Philadelphia, Pennsylvania
- Died: July 19, 1922 (aged 81); Merion, Pennsylvania
- Education: Pennsylvania Academy of the Fine Arts
- Spouse: Thomas Allibone Janvier
- Awards: Mary Smith Prize, Pennsylvania Academy of the Fine Arts 1880

Catherine Ann Janvier (née Drinker; May 1, 1841 – July 19, 1922) was an American artist, author, and translator. (Note: Her first name is also spelled "Catharine".) Before she married, she had an established career as an artist and teacher under the name Catherine Ann Drinker.

== Early life ==
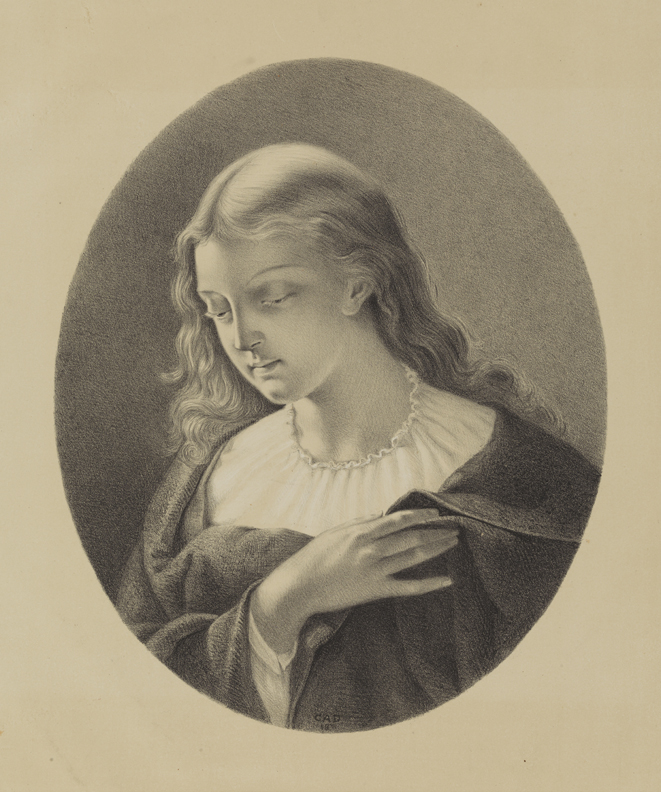
Catherine Ann Drinker (Janvier), Blessed are the Meek, 1871, three-color lithograph, Pennsylvania Academy of the Fine Arts

Catherine Ann Drinker was born on May 1, 1841, in Philadelphia to (Henry) Sandwith Drinker and Susannah Budd (née Shober) Drinker. Her father commanded ships involved in East India trade and then established a partnership called James and Drinker in Hong Kong and Macao. He was a merchant or adjacents-ports agent for organizations in New York, Boston, and Philadelphia. Janvier was the oldest of four children. She had a sister and two brothers. Her brother Robert was born in 1845, Henry was born in 1850, and Elizabeth in 1853.

Sandwith Drinker lived in Hong Kong by 1845 and the rest of the family was there about 1849. Janvier was a friend and correspondent of student Townsend Harris, who became the first Minister to Japan for the United States. Janvier studied oriental arts, the French and Latin languages, literature, and mathematics. She was also interested in horse-back riding and dancing. At ten or fifteen years of age, one of her father's business associates and a powerful merchant, Hukwa, tried unsuccessfully to arrange a marriage between Janvier and his son.

The Drinkers were living in the orient during the Opium Wars when the relationships between foreign traders and the Chinese was difficult. The Drinkers lived in Macao by 1857. In January 1857, (Note: The biography of Cecilia Beaux stated that the event occurred in January 1858.) Sandwith Drinker was poisoned and died of dysentery, believed to be the result of a politically motivated mass poisoning of bread at a bakery. About 400 foreigners "suffered great impairment of health" due to arsenic poisoning. (Note: Lady Bowring, the wife of Sir John Bowring, Governor of Hong Kong, died in 1858. The cause of her death was determined to be arsenic poisoning.)

Susannah Drinker sailed with her children from China to Baltimore. During the trip, when the captain was drunk, Janvier navigated the ship because the First Officer did not have sufficient ability to read the charts. Her mother established Mrs. Drinker's Academy for Young Ladies in Baltimore. Susannah Drinker was diagnosed with a uterine tumor and died in March 1860. (Note: An East India Company Cemetery states that she died in 1857 or 1858, possibly as a result of lasting effects of the poison.)

Janvier kept the school open for a time, and then closed it to pursue a career in art. She took the responsibility for providing for the family, including her grandmother.

== Education and art career ==
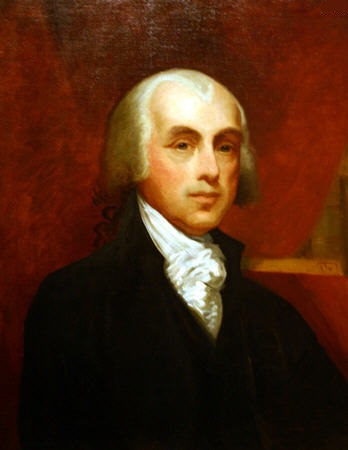
Catherine A. Drinker (Janvier), James Madison, 1875, Independence National Historical Park, Philadelphia, Pennsylvania

Janvier, who studied and worked under the name Catherine Ann Drinker, studied art at the Maryland Institute with Adolf van der Whelan. In 1865, Janvier and the other Drinker children moved to their cousin Ann Elmslie's house in Philadelphia at 1906 Pine Street. Cathrine Drinker took classes at the Pennsylvania Academy of the Fine Arts, where she studied under Thomas Eakins. A life drawing class was established for women at the school in 1868. Ida Waugh and Emily Sartain were among her fellow students. Janvier taught art at Miss Sanford's School in 1870 and through private lessons. One of her private students was Cecilia Beaux, with whom she had much in common (Note: Janvier and Beaux both had a need to support themselves in early adulthood, they shared a May 1 birthdate, lost their mothers, lost/didn't have a relationship with their fathers, lived with their grandmothers, and were both interested in their family's history. Janvier recommended a school and helped her get Beaux her first job at Miss Sanford's School as a drawing instructor.) and became good friends. Cecilia's sister, Aimée Ernesta Beaux, married Henry Sturgis Drinker, Janvier's brother.

From 1873 to 1874, she ran Francis Adolf Van der Wielen's school, and Beaux was her student at that time. In the mid 1870s she studied under Thomas Eakins at the Pennsylvania Academy. In New York, she studied at the Art Students League.

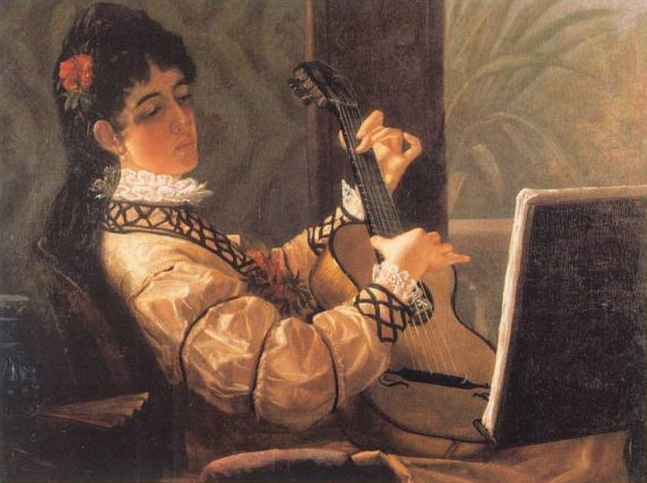
Catharine Ann Drinker Janvier, Old-fashioned Music (Guitar Player), 1880, Neville-Strass Collection, Florida

Aside from teaching, Janvier also created marketable paintings of people, still-life, and genre scenes that sold for about $300 (equivalent to $8,795 in 2025) each painting in New York City. The paintings of Geoffrey Rudel and the Countess of Tripoli (1870), James Madison (1875), Daniel at Prayer (1876) and the lithograph Blessed Are the Meek (1871), all helped to develop her reputation as an artist. Geoffrey Rudel and the Countess of Tripoli was exhibited at the Union League of Philadelphia and James Madison was purchased by the city of Philadelphia and is now in the collection of the Independence National Historical Park. She exhibited her works of art at PAFA from 1876 to the mid-1880s. Drinker won the Mary Smith Prize in 1880 for The Guitar Player, which in 1922 was among the collection of the Neighborhood Guild at Peace Dale, Rhode Island.

At the age of 27, she was the first woman to teach at the academy in 1878. Janviers gave lectures about perspective and wrote the book Lessons in Perspective.

== Marriage ==
On September 26, 1878, Catherine Ann Drinker married journalist Thomas Allibone Janvier in Drifton, Pennsylvania at St. James Church. By the mid-1880s, the Janviers had moved to New York City and Catherine has begun a transition from artist to writer. The Janviers enjoyed a happy marriage in which they lived in England among literary circles and in Provence between 1883 and 1890. Their friends included poets and writers Roumanille, Felix Gras, and Mistral. Besides Europe, the Janviers also traveled to Mexico. When they were not out of the country, they lived in New York City. They were close friends of William Sharp, who they met in 1892. Catherine was among the first to know that Fiona Mcleod was his secret pseudonym.

== Career transition ==
Janvier translated a book about painting china that French ceramist Camille Piton-who moved to Philadelphia in 1878 and established an art school- wrote in 1878. Janvier titled the book China Painting in America (1879). She taught pottery. In 1880 the book Practical Keramics for Students was published. Janvier translated two books by Felix Gras: The White Terror and The Reds of the Midi. They royalties for the books went to Gras, which helped to fund the education of his sons.

Janvier enjoyed Homer and had an interest in Greek history, partially realized in her manuscript Captain Dyonisius [sic], which was published in 1935 as Captain Dionysios, A Romance of Old Marseilles under Janvier's name by her brother Henry. In 1904, her book London Mews was published.

Both Thomas and Catherine Janvier wrote for Harper's Weekly.

Janvier was a member of the Society for the Promotion of Hellenic Studies, London's Pioneer Club, and the Woman's Cosmopolitan Club in New York City.

== Death ==
Thomas died on June 18, 1913. Catherine lived on 59th Street in New York from 1913 to 1918 and with her brother Dr. Henry Drinker in Merion, Pennsylvania, by 1921, when she appeared on the Social Register. She died in Merion at the home of her brother in 1922. She was the aunt of Catherine Drinker Bowen. Manuscripts, correspondence, and other papers are held at the New York Public Library.

== Collections ==
- Independence National Historical Park, Philadelphia, Pennsylvania
  - James Madison, after Gilbert Stuart, circa 1875
- Pennsylvania Academy of the Fine Arts
  - Blessed are the Meek, 1871, three-color lithograph on cream wove paper
  - Old-Fashioned Music, 1880, pen and ink over black and orange pencil on cream paper
  - Man Gazing Heavanward with Cross, three-color lithograph on cream wove paper
