= A Dog of Flanders =

1872 novel by Marie Louise de la Ramée

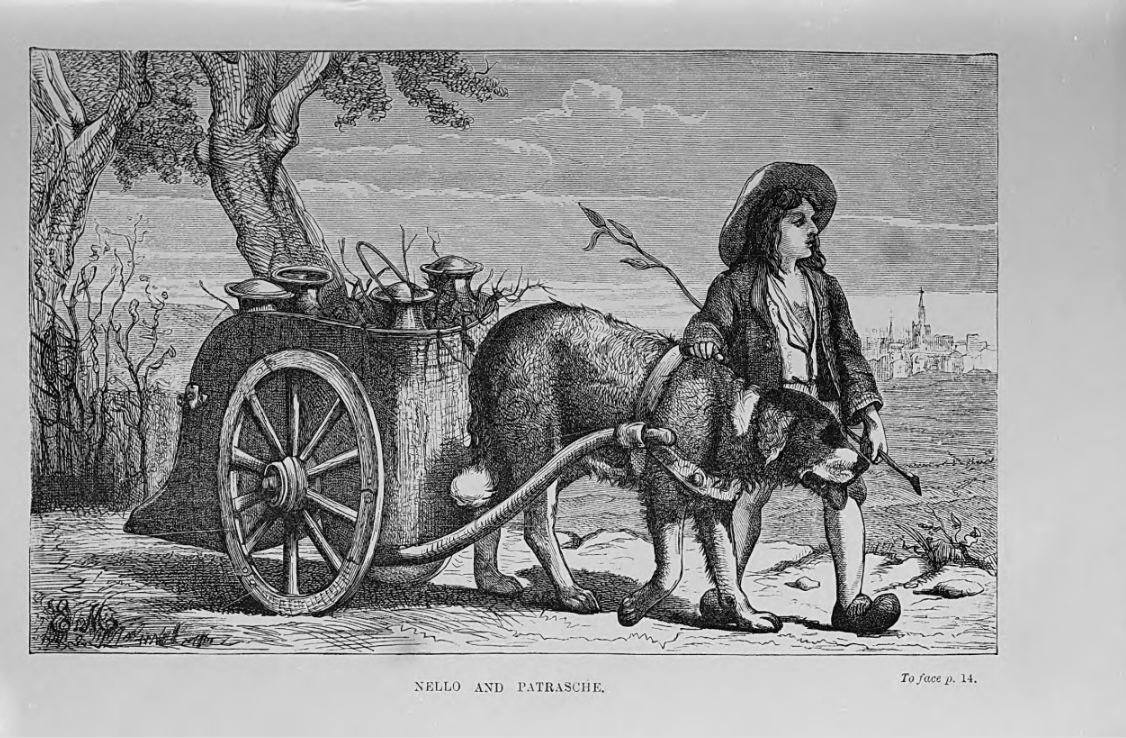
- 1872 illustration by Enrico Mazzanti
- Author: Marie Louise de la Ramée
- Illustrator: E. B. Bensell (US); Enrico Mazzanti (UK)
- Language: English
- Genre: Children's literature, Romance, Drama, Tragedy
- Set in: 19th-century Flanders, Antwerp
- Publisher: Lippincott (US); Chapman & Hall (UK); Tauchnitz (Germany)
- Publication date: December 1871 (magazine); 25 January 1872 (volume)
- Publication place: United States; United Kingdom; Germany
- Media type: Print (Hardcover)
- Pages: 22 (US) (Note: Printed in a two-column layout.); 64 (UK); 63 (Germany)
- Text: A Dog of Flanders at Wikisource

A Dog of Flanders is an 1872 novel by English author Marie Louise de la Ramée published under her pseudonym "Ouida". It is about a Flemish boy named Nello and his dog, Patrasche, and is set in Antwerp.

In Japan, Korea, Russia, Ukraine and the Philippines, the novel has been a popular children's classic for decades and has been adapted into several Japanese films and anime. Since the 1980s, the Belgian board of tourism noticed the phenomenon and built two monuments honoring the story to attract East-Asian tourists. There is a small statue of Nello and Patrasche at the Kapelstraat in the Antwerp suburb of Hoboken, and a commemorative plaque in front of the Antwerp Cathedral donated by Toyota, that was later replaced by a marble statue of the two characters covered by a cobblestone blanket, created by the artist Batist Vermeulen.

== Summary ==
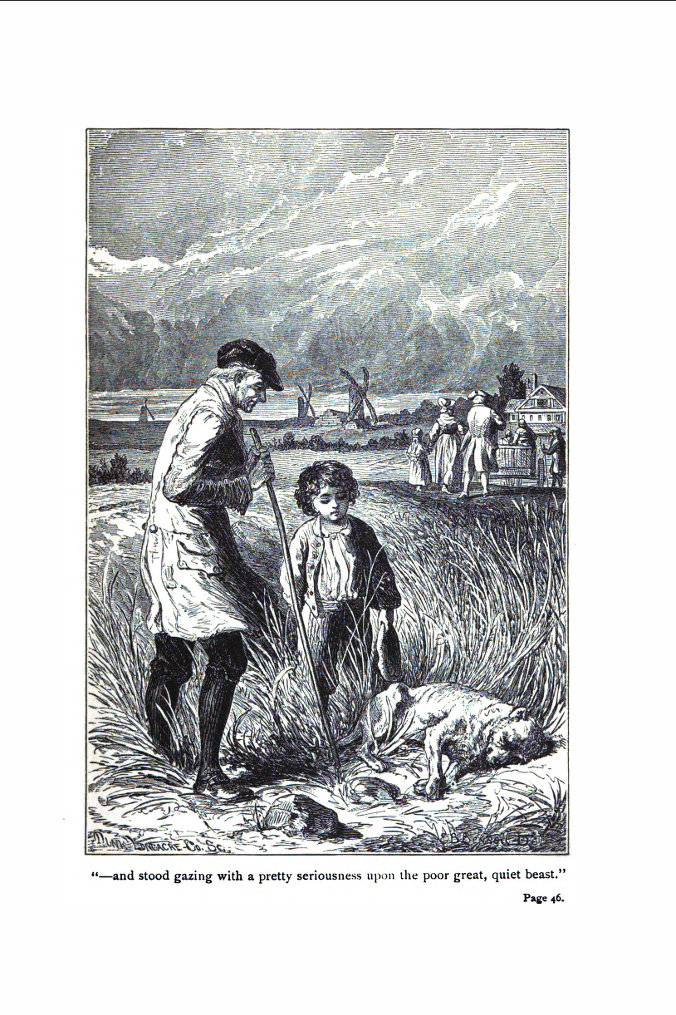
Nello and his grandfather Jehan Daas find Patrasche. "—and stood gazing with a pretty seriousness upon the poor, great, quiet beast."

In 19th-century Belgium, a boy named Nello becomes an orphan at the age of two when his mother dies in the Ardennes. His impoverished grandfather, Jehan Daas, who lives in a small village near the city of Antwerp, takes him in.

One day, Nello and Jehan find a dog that was almost beaten to death by his previous owner, and name him "Patrasche". Due to the good care and kindness shown to him by Jehan, the dog recovers its health, and from then on, Nello and Patrasche are inseparable. Nello is forced to work as a milk seller, because Jehan's unnamed, crooked landlord demands that he pay more rent money or face eviction. Patrasche helps Nello pull his small milk cart into town each morning.

Nello is a close friend of Alois, the daughter of Baas ("boss" or "chief" in Dutch) Cogez, a well-off man in the village, but Cogez objects, as he doesn't want his daughter to have a poor sweetheart. Although Nello is illiterate, he is very talented in drawing and dreams of becoming an artist; he also longs to see Rubens’ The Elevation of the Cross and The Descent from the Cross in the cathedral of Antwerp, although the exhibition is only for paying visitors and he has no money. He enters a junior drawing contest in Antwerp, hoping to win the first prize of 200 francs per year.

Sometime afterward, a fire breaks out on Cogez's property. The previous evening, Nello had been seen in the area after giving Alois a puppet he had found on the street. Cogez, suspecting the boy is responsible for the fire, then tells Nello that he is never to see Alois again. Later, Jehan dies, and the landlord promptly evicts Nello and Patrasche. With no home, they are forced to wander the streets.

On Christmas Eve, the winner of the drawing contest is announced – it is not Nello – and the boy faints from shock. Later that evening, Patrasche finds in the snow a bag containing 6,000 francs belonging to Cogez. Despite his misery, Nello returns it to Alois and her mother, entrusts his dog to them, and then leaves. When Cogez returns, distraught after searching in vain for the money he had lost, he is stunned to find that Nello has brought it back to him. Deeply moved, he repents of his behaviour and decides to make amends by welcoming Nello as his own son. Although the family treats Patrasche with great kindness, the dog manages to slip away and runs off to find Nello. He arrives at the cathedral, whose door had been left unlocked, and finds his owner lying on the floor. The moonlight illuminates the two Rubens paintings, which the boy had unveiled upon entering, allowing him to finally admire them. At last content, Nello is able to rest, embracing his faithful dog.

The next morning, the two are found dead of hypothermia in front of the triptych. Alois mourns the death of her friend, and even her father weeps, overcome with remorse. Later, a world-famous painter who had noticed Nello's drawing for the contest arrives, intending to take him in as a pupil and support him, but it is too late. Grief-stricken and ashamed of their behaviour, the villagers decide to bury Nello and Patrasche together in a single grave.

== Background ==
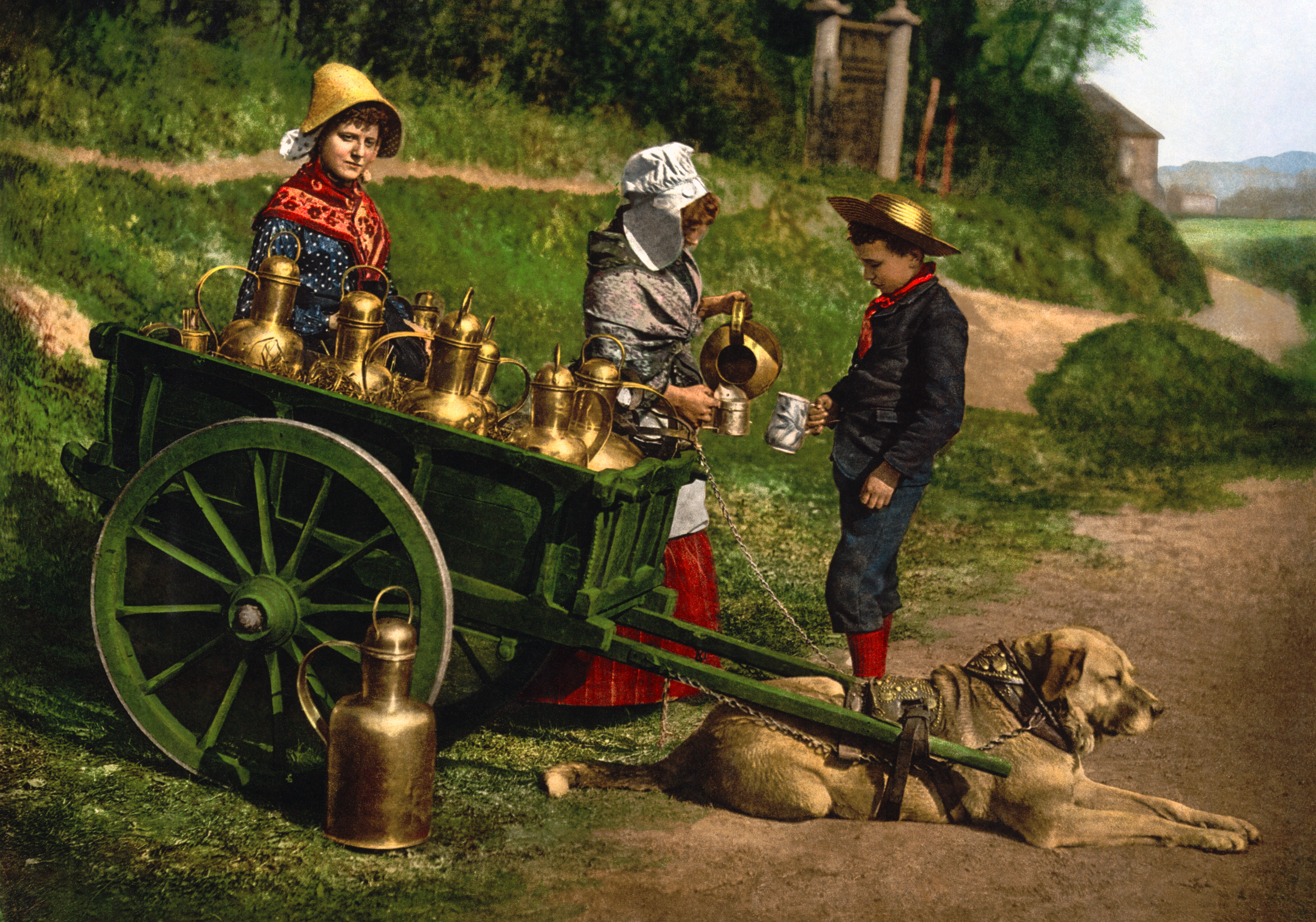
Children selling milk from a dogcart, Belgium, c. 1890

The story is set around the mid-nineteenth century, as it is stated that approximately half a century has passed since the Napoleonic Wars, in which Nello's grandfather had fought.

In the summer of 1871, Ouida spent a few weeks in Belgium. She remained mostly in her hotel room in Brussels and went out only for two-day trips to Flanders — to Bruges and Antwerp — which provided her with material for four Belgian stories centered on the artist's struggle against a harsh world.

Her brief stay in Flanders, and especially in Antwerp, left a lasting impression on Ouida. As an animal lover and future animal-rights activist, she was struck by the use of dogs as draft animals, which she considered cruel, as well as by the fact that paintings—such as those by Rubens—were not freely accessible to the public but could only be viewed for a fee. The story reflects the conflict between her convictions and what she saw as the reality of Catholic and hypocritical Flanders, and her identification with the misunderstood artist Nello.

== Publication history ==
The story was first published in December 1871 in Philadelphia, in the Lippincott's Magazine, under the full title A Dog of Flanders: A Story of Nöel, with an illustration by E. B. Bensell. (Note: The illustrator is not credited in the book, but the signature appears on the illustrations.) It was included the following month in a collection of four Ouida tales, A Leaf in the Storm, and Other Stories, issued by three different publishers: Lippincott in Philadelphia on 25 January, Chapman & Hall in London on 27 July, and, also in English, Tauchnitz in Leipzig in December 1872. The UK edition contained an illustration by Enrico Mazzanti, whereas the German edition was not illustrated. Moreover, these latter two editions had the tale divided into four chapters. Other notable illustrators of the work include George Henry Boughton (1891), Edmund H. Garrett (1893), Maria Louise Kirk (1909), Hiram P. Barnes (1914), Gustaf Tenggren (1925), Frances Brundage (1926), and Harvey Fuller (1927).

Originally not written for children, the story was later reissued numerous times, both in other collections and as a standalone work, and is therefore generally regarded as a children's novel, although its brevity – just 14,102 words – makes it closer to a novelette.

== Reception ==
After its publication in volume form, the story was generally well received by critics. The Examiner praised it as «one of the saddest and best tales that have appeared for many a day,» while the Penny Illustrated Paper likewise responded favorably. Peterson's Magazine wrote: «It is a pity that this author does not always write as she has done in “A Leaf in a Storm,” and “A Dog of Flanders”. It is difficult, indeed, to conceive how the same pen could write these pure, healthful, pathetic tales, and the morbid exaggerations known as the “Ouida” novels». The only markedly dissenting voice was The Pall Mall Gazette, which questioned the story's portrayal of Belgian society, remarking: «whether Ouida does justice to Belgian philanthropy in supposing that there would not have been, at least, a Flemish woman or two to assist Patrasche in bringing back the good-looking boy to life.»

An anecdote recorded in a letter by the artist Edward Burne-Jones to the society hostess Lady Frances Horner offers a further indication of the story's popularity in late Victorian cultural circles. Writing about an episode that likely took place in the 1880s, Burne-Jones recalled: «I remember Ruskin and Cardinal Manning routing [= rooting] on their knees amongst some books to find "The Dog of Flanders" which they loved; getting covered with dust and searching with enthusiasm.»

== Popularity ==
The novel is reasonably notable in the United Kingdom and in the United States and is extremely popular in Ukraine, Russia, Japan, Korea and the Philippines to the point where it is seen as a children's classic. It inspired film and anime adaptations, including the 1975 animated TV series Dog of Flanders which reached an audience of 30 million viewers on its first broadcast.

In Belgium, the story is more obscure. In 1878, it received a Dutch adaptation by the Flemish author Hendrik Sermon, with the characters’ names changed: Nello to Kola, Patrasche to Patrijsken, Alois to Louise, Jehan Daas to Jan Dehaes and Cogez to Tobels. In 1985, a new Dutch translation was published, illustrated by Willy Vandersteen; this happened after the tale was adapted into a story of Vandersteen's popular comic book series Suske en Wiske. Since then, monuments were raised to commemorate Nello and Patrasche to please tourists. In 2007, Didier Volckaert and A van Dienderen directed a documentary about the international popularity of the story: Patrasche, A Dog of Flanders – Made in Japan. It researches all available film adaptations of the story and interviews several British, American and Japanese people about what attracts them to this novel.

== Adaptations ==
The novel has been adapted for cinema and television in live-action and animation. Many of the film versions, excluding the 1997 Japanese movie and Snow Prince (2009), replace the original ending with a more optimistic one. For its authentic 19th century buildings, the Open Air Museum of Bokrijk, Flanders was used as scenery for the 1975 and 1992 anime and the 1999 film.

=== Film ===
- A Dog of Flanders (1914), a short film directed by Howell Hansel.
- A Boy of Flanders (1924), directed by Victor Schertzinger and starring Jackie Coogan as Nello.
- A Dog of Flanders (1935), directed by Edward Sloman.
- A Dog of Flanders (1959), directed by James B. Clark and starring David Ladd as Nello. In this version, Nello and his dog go to the village church, where the pastor covers them with a woolen blanket, thus saving their lives. Two days later, one of the judges comes. Because he thought Nello was the true winner, he asks him to stay with him. As years pass, Patrasche dies and Nello becomes a famous artist.
- The Dog of Flanders (Japan, 1997), a remake of the 1975 TV series directed by Yoshio Kuroda. In this version, Alois reflects on the life of Nello while working as a nun. The landlord is also named Hans.
- A Dog of Flanders (1999), directed by Kevin Brodie. In this version, the landlord is named Stevens and the ending reveals that the character Michel La Grande is Nello's long-lost father.
- Barking Dogs Never Bite (2000), a South Korean satirical version directed by Bong Joon-ho.
- Snow Prince (Japan, 2009), directed by Joji Matsuoka. At the end of this film, the boy and the dog are found frozen to death under a tree.

=== Television ===
- Dog of Flanders (1975), a Japanese animated TV series produced by Nippon Animation, consisting of 52 25-minute episodes.
- "A Dog of Flanders" (1976), a 10-minute episode of the Japanese animated TV series Manga Fairy Tales of the World, produced by Dax International.
- My Patrasche (1992), a Japanese animated TV series produced by Tokyo Movie Shinsha, consisting of 26 25-minute episodes.
- A Dog of Flanders (2006), a Korean limited animated streaming series produced by language education company Little Fox, consisting of 16 episodes of 5-6 minutes each.

=== Documentary film ===
- Patrasche, a Dog of Flanders – Made in Japan (2007), a documentary film directed by Didier Volckaert and An van Dienderen.

=== Comic book version ===
The story was used as a plot device in the Suske en Wiske comic book series, namely the album Het Dreigende Dinges (The Threatening Thing) (1985). The album was translated into Japanese.

=== Video games ===
- A Dog of Flanders, 2011, Minoto Studios
- A Dog of Flanders, 2024, Studio Libeccio

== Location and monuments ==
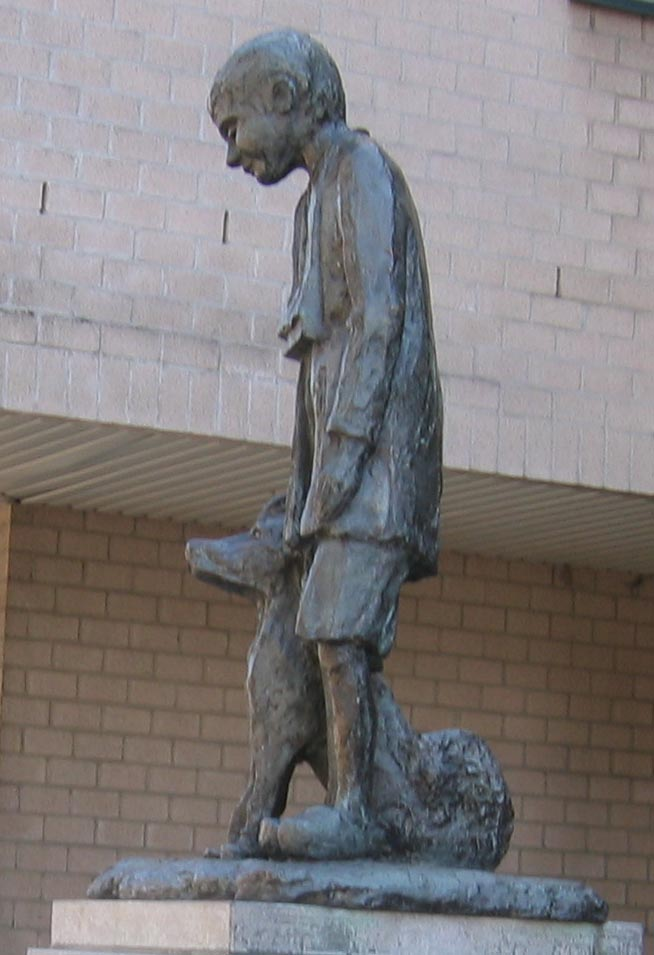
Nello and Patrasche in Kapelstraat, Hoboken, Antwerp

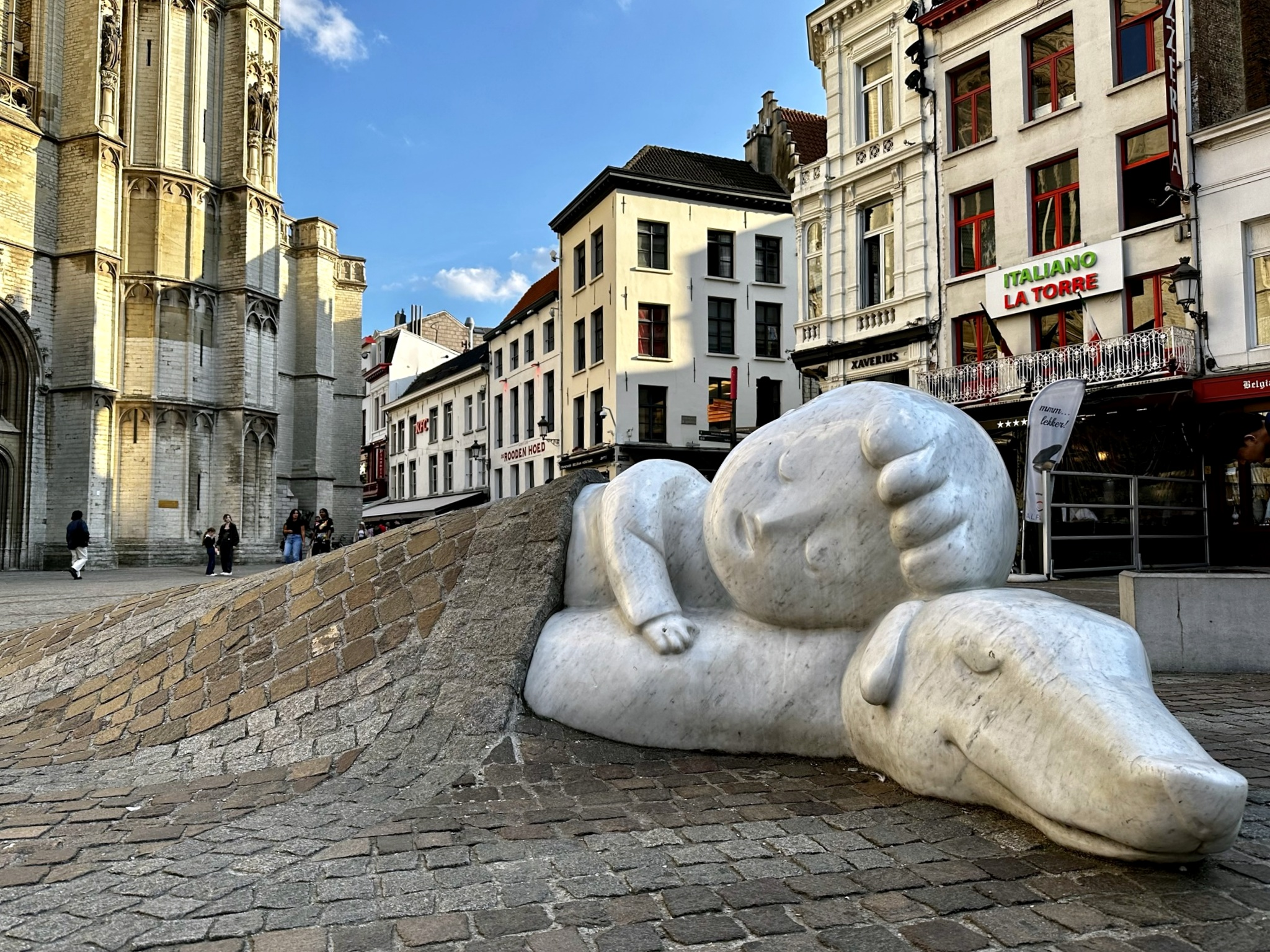
Nello and Patrasche outside the Cathedral of Our Lady in Antwerp

In 1985 an employee of Antwerp tourism, Jan Corteel, learned of the popularity of A Dog of Flanders in East Asia and attempted to develop a tourist itinerary for it. He presumed the village in which the majority of the story takes place to be Hoboken, even though this is never mentioned in the story itself. Ouida is believed to have visited Antwerp for four hours, and spoke of having seen a village near a canal, not far from a windmill. This vague explanation was used to claim the story took place in Hoboken, but other people contest this. Corteel attracted funds for a monument, which was built in 1985 in the Kapelstraat in Hoboken.

In 1997, American painter Tony Mafia created 'Nello's Dream'. He donated the work to the Hoboken district of Antwerp, where it is now on public display at the district's administrative centre.

A second monument, now removed, was donated by Toyota in 2003 in front of Antwerp Cathedral. A mock gravestone, it had text in English and Japanese that read: "Nello, and his dog Patrasche, main characters from the story A Dog of Flanders, symbols of true and sternful friendship, loyalty and devotion."

On 10 December 2016, the gravestone was replaced by a new monument. A sculpture in white marble represents Nello and Patrasche sleeping, covered by a blanket of cobble stones. The sculpture is made by Belgian artist Batist "Tist" Vermeulen. The removal of the gravestone was accompanied by a noticeable decline in the number of Japanese tourists, the reason for which is unclear.

== Additional information ==
Similar stories:

- The Little Match Girl (1845)
- The Beggar Boy at Christ's Christmas Tree (1876)
- Black Beauty (1877)
- Hachi: A Dog's Tale (2009)

== Sources ==
- King, Andrew (December 2015). "The Case of Ouida's «A Dog of Flanders» (1871‑Today)" (PDF). English Literature. 2 (2).
