= E. B. Bensell =

American painter and illustrator

- Born: Edmund Birckhead Bensell; June 11, 1842; Philadelphia, Pennsylvania
- Died: November 24, 1894 (aged 52); Philadelphia, Pennsylvania
- Education: Pennsylvania Academy of the Fine Arts
- Known for: Illustration
- Movement: Philadelphia Sketch Club

Edmund Birckhead Bensell (June 11, 1842 – November 24, 1894) was an American artist and illustrator, usually known as E. B. Bensell. While an accomplished painter, he is best known for his ink drawings, particularly his illustrations for Charles F. Hazeltine's edition of Shakespeare.

== Life and family ==
Bensell was born in Philadelphia, Pennsylvania, the son of Edmund Shippen Bensell and Margaret Sperry Bensell. His older brother was artist George Frederick Bensell. As an adult he lived in the Mount Airy neighborhood of Philadelphia. On March 20, 1871, Bensell married Eliza Robert Poole, a musician who frequently sang in the city's churches. They had one daughter, Marion Bensell, born in 1874. He died at the age of 52 in or near Philadelphia.

== Career ==
Bensell and his brother George both attended and graduated from the Pennsylvania Academy of the Fine Arts. While there, in 1860, they joined with four other students to form the Philadelphia Sketch Club, one of America's oldest existing artists' clubs. George was the club's first president, and It first met in his studio. Bensell also served as club president, from 1869 to 1871. The brothers' enthusiastic abolitionist feelings influenced its early political sentiments, and many of their early sketches were published in its popular publication, the Sketch Club Portfolio. At first primarily a painter, Bensell made his reputation and career as an illustrator in the magazines and books of his day. He worked at various times for the firms of Harper & Brothers, J. B. Lippincott & Co., Charles Scribner's Sons and J. M. Stoddard & Co. His illustrations often appeared together with those of his brother until the latter's premature death in 1879.

== Bibliography of books illustrated ==
- Memoirs of a Good-for-Nothing by Charles Godfrey Leland (1866)
- A Christmas Poem by George Wither (1870)
- Ting-a-ling by Frank R. Stockton (1870) (Project Gutenberg e-text) (Internet Archive e-text)
- The Vicar of Bullhampton by Anthony Trollope (1870)
- Great Fortunes, and How They Were Made, or, The Struggles and Triumphs of Our Self-Made Men by James Dabney McCabe, Jr. (1871) (Project Gutenberg e-text) (Internet Archive e-text)
- A Leaf in the Storm, and Other Stories by Ouida (1872) (Google Books e-text)
- The judge's pets : stories of a family and its dumb friends / by E. Johnson (1872) (Google Books e-text)
- The underground rail road; a record of facts, authentic narratives, letters, &c. narrating the hardships hair-breadth escapes and death struggles of the slaves in their efforts for freedom, as related by themselves and others, or witnessed by the author; together with sketches of some of the largest stockholders, and most liberal aiders and advisers of the road / by William Still (1872)
- Round-about rambles in lands of fact and fancy. / by Frank R. Stockton, Marian E. Stockton, Émile Antoine Bayard, and others (1874)
- A century after : picturesque glimpses of Philadelphia and Pennsylvania,: including Fairmount, the Wissahickon, and other romantic localities, with the cities and landscapes of the state. A pictorial representation of scenery, architecture, life, manners and character / by Edward Strahan (1875)
- Washington and seventy-six / by Lucy E. Guernsey and Clara F. Guernsey (1876)
- The boy's Percy : being old ballads of war, adventure and love from Bishop Thomas Percy's "Reliques of Ancient English Poetry" together with an appendix containing two ballads from the original Percy folio ms. / by Thomas Percy (1881) (Internet Archive e-text)
- Ting-a-ling tales / by Frank R. Stockton (1882)
- Little Bell : and other stories for boys and girls / by Margaret Vandegrift (1884)
- The absent-minded fairy : for boys and girls / by Margaret Vandegrift (1884)
- Davy and the goblin, or, What Followed Reading "Alice's Adventures in Wonderland" / by Charles E. Carryl (1885) (Wikisource e-text) (Project Gutenberg e-text) (Internet Archive e-text)
- The United States Secret Service in the late war : comprising the author's introduction to the leading men at Washington, with the origin and organization of the United States Secret Service Bureau, and a graphic history of rich and exciting experiences, North and South. With a profuse galaxy of magnificent full-page illustrations of exquisite beauty ... / by La Fayette C. Baker (1889)
- Daring exploits of scouts and spies : a graphic history of rich and exciting experiences, perilous adventures, hairbreadth escapes ... / by La Fayette C. Baker (1894)
- Pleasure book for little folks / by William Brunton, James W. Louderbach, and others (1894)
- The Good time story book. : Pictures and stories for boys and girls / by William H. Van Ingen, Henry M. Snyder, and others (1894)
- Imaginotions; Truthless Tales / by Tudor Jenks (1894) (Internet Archive e-text)
- The Mammoth story book. : Full of pictures / by George G. White, William H. Van Ingen, and others (1894)
- The poor count's Christmas / by Frank R. Stockton (1927)

== General references ==
- Ask/Art Academic entry
- Falk, Peter Hastings, ed. Who Was Who in American Art: 400 years of artists in America. 2d. ed. 3 vols. Madison, Conn.: Sound View Press, 1999.
- Hotchkin, Samuel Fitch. Ancient and Modern Germantown, Mount Airy and Chestnut Hill. Philadelphia: P. W. Ziegler & Co., 1889, pp. 101–102 (sketch on grandfather, Dr. Charles Bensell).
- Hamilton, Sinclair. Early American Book Illustrators and Wood Engravers, 1670-1870: a catalogue of a collection of American books illustrated for the most part with woodcuts and wood engravings in the Princeton University Library. 2 vols. Princeton, New Jersey: Princeton University Press, 1958, 1968.
- Philadelphia Sketch Club website (includes biographies on E.B. Bensell and George F. Bensell)
- Robeson, Susan Stroud, et al. An Historical and Genealogical Account of Andrew Robeson of Scotland, New Jersey and Pennsylvania, and of His Descendants from 1653 to 1916. Philadelphia: J. B. Lippincott Company, 1916, pp. 146, 230.
- Shaw, John Mackay. Childhood in Poetry: a catalogue, with biographical and critical annotations, of the books of English and American poets comprising the Shaw Childhood in Poetry Collection in the Library of the Florida State University. Detroit: Gale Research, 1967.
