= Enrico Mazzanti =

Italian engineer and cartoonist

- Born: 5 April 1850; Florence, Grand Duchy of Tuscany
- Died: 3 September 1910 (aged 60); Florence, Tuscany, Kingdom of Italy
- Occupations: Illustrator; cartoonist; book designer; engineer
- Writing career
- Genre: Children's books
- Notable work: The Adventures of Pinocchio (illustrator)

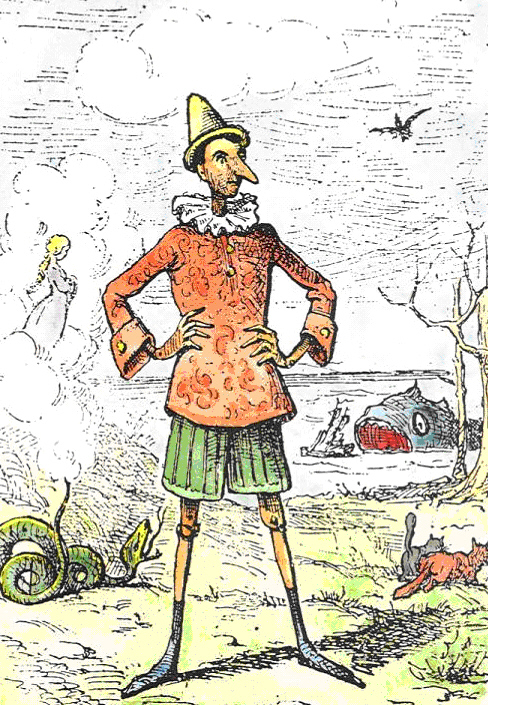
Enrico Mazzanti's illustration of Pinocchio

Enrico Mazzanti (5 April 1850 – 3 September 1910) was an Italian engineer and cartoonist who illustrated the first edition of Carlo Collodi's The Adventures of Pinocchio.

== Life and career ==
After obtaining a degree in civil engineering, he turned to drawing for the publishing industry, producing illustrative material for scientific and literary volumes, while specialising primarily in illustrations for children’s books.

In 1872, Mazzanti illustrated the first UK edition of A Dog of Flanders, and Other Stories, which included the eponymous popular story.

His name is closely associated with the first edition of The Adventures of Pinocchio (Le avventure di Pinocchio. Storia di un burattino) by Collodi, published in 1883 by the Libreria Editrice Felice Paggi of Florence. The success of his vignettes was such that they were also requested for some of the earliest foreign editions: the UK (1892), the US (1898, together with Giuseppe Magni), Spain (Bemporad, 1901, under the title Pinoncito), and France (1902, under the title Les aventures de Pinocchio, histoire d’une marionnette, again together with Magni).

His collaboration with Collodi, which had begun as early as 1876 with I racconti delle fate, a translation of French fairy tales by Charles Perrault and other authors, the Florentine writer’s first work, continued in the following years with the same publisher, Paggi, with Macchiette (1884), Storie allegre, libro per i ragazzi (1887), and a new edition with fresh illustrations of I racconti delle fate (1887), and later with Bemporad, which published La lanterna magica di Giannettino (1890) and issued a third edition of I racconti delle fate (1892).

Mazzanti also illustrated several works by Emma Perodi, the writer and journalist who served for many years as editor of the Giornale dei bambini.

In addition, he illustrated texts by numerous other authors of children’s literature and worked for several of the leading Italian publishing houses, in Florence for Giuseppe Ferroni, Sansoni, Felice Paggi (bookseller and publisher), Bemporad, and Le Monnier, and in Turin for Paravia.
