= George Frederick Bensell =

American painter

- Born: George Frederick Bensell; January 10, 1837; Philadelphia, Pennsylvania
- Died: May 26, 1879 (aged 42); Philadelphia, Pennsylvania
- Education: Pennsylvania Academy of Fine Arts
- Known for: Illustration
- Movement: Philadelphia Sketch Club

George Frederick Bensell (January 10, 1837 – May 26, 1879) was an American artist and illustrator, usually known as George Bensell, G. F. Bensell or George F. Bensell. He is best known for his paintings and role in forming the Philadelphia Sketch Club.

== Life and family ==
Bensell was born in Philadelphia, Pennsylvania, the son of Edmund Shippen Bensell and Margaret (Sperry) Bensell. His younger brother was artist Edmund Birckhead Bensell. As an adult he lived in the Mount Airy neighborhood of Philadelphia. Bensell married, June 7, 1871, Josephine Crissman, of Milford, Pennsylvania. They had three children, Paul, Sperry, and Grace Bensell, all of whom died young. He died at the age of forty-two in Philadelphia. After the deaths of her children and husband Josephine returned to Milford, where after two decades of widowhood she married J. C. Westbrook in 1900. She died after a brief illness in October, 1907.

== Career ==
Bensell initially studied with the artist John L. Lambdin; he and his brother Edmund also both attended and graduated from the Pennsylvania Academy of Fine Arts. Afterwards he was named an Academician and was an instructor there.

As an artist Bensell was primarily a painter, specializing in portraits, landscapes, historical and "poetical genre" subjects for a wealthy clientele. His secondary occupation was that of illustrator in the magazines and books of his day, in which he often collaborated with his brother.

In 1860, while still students, the two brothers joined with four other students to form the Philadelphia Sketch Club, one of America's oldest existing artists' clubs. It first met in Bensell's Philadelphia studio. A lifelong member, he served as its first president. and held the office on two later occasions as well. The brothers' enthusiastic abolitionist feelings influenced its early political sentiments, and many of their early sketches were published in its popular publication, the Sketch Club Portfolio.

== General references ==
- Ask/Art Academic entry
- Falk, Peter Hastings, ed. Who Was Who in American Art: 400 years of artists in America. 2d. ed. 3 vols. Madison, Conn.: Sound View Press, 1999.
- Groce, George C., and Wallace, David H. The New-York Historical Society's Dictionary of Artists in America, 1564- 1860. New Haven, Conn.: Yale University Press, 1957.
- Hotchkin, Samuel Fitch. Ancient and Modern Germantown, Mount Airy and Chestnut Hill. Philadelphia: P. W. Ziegler & Co., 1889, pp. 101–102 (sketch on grandfather, Dr. Charles Bensell).
- Philadelphia Sketch Club website (includes biographies on George F. Bensell and E.B. Bensell)
- Robeson, Susan Stroud, et al. An Historical and Genealogical Account of Andrew Robeson of Scotland, New Jersey and Pennsylvania, and of His Descendants from 1653 to 1916. Philadelphia: J. B. Lippincott Company, 1916, pp. 146, 230.
- Samuels, Peggy and Harold. The Illustrated Biographical Encyclopedia of Artists of the American West. Garden City, New York: Doubleday & Co., 1976.
