= Janvier (given name) =

Janvier is a given name. Notable people with this given name are:

- Janvier Charles Mbarga (born 1985), Cameroonian football player
- Janvier Grondin (born 1947), Quebec politician
- Janvier Maharangy, Malagasy politician

== See also ==
- Janvier (disambiguation)
- January, the month called "janvier" in French
