= Janvier =

Janvier is French for the month of January.

Janvier may also refer to:

== Persons ==
- Janvier (given name)
- Janvier (surname)
- Joseph Janvier Woodward (1833–1884), commonly known as J. J. Woodward, American surgeon

== Places ==
- Janvier 194, Indian reserve, Alberta
- Janvier South, Alberta, Canada
  - Janvier Airport, airport in Janvier South
- Saint-Janvier-de-Joly, Quebec

== Others ==
- Janvier v. Sweeney, a 1919 decision by the English Court of Appeal dealing with liability for nervous shock caused by an intentional act
