= Thomas Allibone Janvier =

American novelist

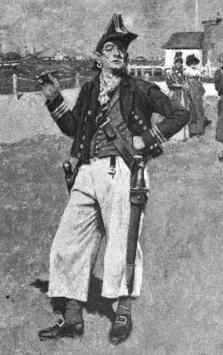
Illustration from In Old New York 1894

Thomas Allibone Janvier (July 16, 1849 – June 18, 1913) was an American story-writer and historian, born in Philadelphia of Provençal descent.

== Early life and marriage ==
Janvier received a public school education, then worked in Philadelphia for newspapers from 1870-81.

In 1878, he married Catherine Ann Drinker (May 1, 1841- July 19, 1922), an artist who was the first woman teacher at the Pennsylvania Academy of the Fine Arts and first teacher to Cecilia Beaux. Later in life, she accompanied her husband on his travels while writing books and translating books from the Provencale language. Many of Janvier's published works would be dedicated "To C. A. J."

== New York ==
Janvier went to New York in 1881. From 1884-94, he lived in the Washington Square district of New York. A few years after arriving, he published the Ivory Black Stories, tales of artist life, which were reprinted in book form in 1885 as Color Studies. In them he pictured the life and color of what was then considered the Latin quarter of the city, with the old-fashioned French restaurants, the artist colony to the north, and the studios on Tenth Street where Abbey, Millet, F. Hopkinson Smith, Laffan and others made the Tile Club famous. He published many stories and articles in Harper's Magazine.

== Travels and death ==
Janvier spent several years in Colorado, New Mexico and Mexico, thereby gaining inspiration and material for much of his literary work. His travels in Mexico produced the Aztec Treasure House and his stories of Old New Spain.

He and his wife also lived for three years in Avignon, Provence, France, where they became friends with Mistral and Felix Gras. Catherine A. Janvier's translations of the latter's work introduced him to English-speaking readers. His books from this period include An Embassy to Provence, Christmas Kalends of Provence and The South of France. He was made an honorary member of the Félibrige society in France, and of the Fol Lore Society of London, where he and his wife lived from 1897 to 1900, and the Century Club in New York.

Janvier died in New York on June 18, 1913, aged 63. He is interred in Moorestown, New Jersey.

== Literary family ==
Janvier's sister, Margaret Thomson Janvier (1844-1913) became a writer of children's literature and verse, using the pen name Margaret Vandergrift.

Janvier's niece, Emma P. Spicer, going by the stage name of Emma Janvier, was a well-known comedian on Broadway and elsewhere from the turn of the century until her death in the early 1920s.

Janvier's father was the Philadelphia businessman and poet Francis De Haes Janvier.

== Works ==
Books

- Color Studies (1885)
- The Mexican Guide (1886)
- The Aztec Treasure House (1890)
- Stories of Old New Spain (1891)
- The Uncle of an Angel, and Other Stories (1891)
- An Embassy to Provence (1893)
- In Old New York (1894)
- The Women's Conquest of New York (1894), in which the suffrage movement is fictitiously presented
- In the Sargasso Sea (1898)
- The Passing of Thomas, and Other Stories (1900)
- In Great Waters (1901)
- The Christmas Kalends of Provence (1902)
- The Dutch Founding of New York (1903)
- Santa Fe's Trail (1907)
- Henry Hudson: a brief statement of his aims and his achievements (1909)
- Legends of the City of Mexico (1910)
- From the South of France (1912), short stories
- At the Casa Napoleon (1914), which contains a memoir by Ripley Hitchcock

Articles and short stories

- "Pancha, a Story of Monterey" (1884) in The Century Illustrated Monthly Magazine, Vol. 28 p. 656
- "The Sea-Robbers of New York" (1894) in Harper's New Monthly Magazine, Vol 89, Issue 2
- "New York Colonial Privateers" (1895) in Harper's New Monthly Magazine Feb. Vol 90, #537, Frontispiece & p. 333-343
- "A White Penitent" (1901) Harper's vol 103 p. 131
- "Honfleur the Sedate" (April 1904) in Harper's Magazine Vol. 108
