= Dog of Flanders (TV series) =

Japanese anime television series

- Cover art for Kodansha English Library book version of the TV series
- フランダースの犬
- Genre: Drama
- Based on: A Dog of Flanders by Maria Louise Ramé
- Directed by: Yoshio Kuroda
- Music by: Takeo Watanabe
- Country of origin: Japan
- Original language: Japanese
- No. of episodes: 52

Production
- Executive producer: Koichi Motohashi
- Producers: Junzō Nakajima; Shigehito Takahashi; Takaji Matsudo
- Production companies: Zuiyo Eizo (#1–26); Nippon Animation (#27–52); Fuji Television

Original release
- Network: FNS (Fuji TV)
- Release: January 5 – December 28, 1975

Related
- Anime film

The Dog of Flanders
- Directed by: Yoshio Kuroda
- Produced by: Junzō Nakajima
- Written by: Miho Maruo
- Music by: Tarō Iwashiro
- Studio: Nippon Animation
- Licensed by: NA: AnimEigo
- Released: 15 March 1997 (Japan)
- Runtime: 103 minutes

Dog of Flanders (フランダースの犬, Furandāsu no Inu) is a 1975 Japanese anime television series adaptation of Ouida's 1872 novel of the same name, directed by Yoshio Kuroda and produced by Nippon Animation. 52 episodes were produced. A film version was released in 1997.

The series represents the bond between a boy and his ever so faithful dog living in a 19th-century Flanders village near Antwerp. The emotional story shows the boy's struggles in life, and his hopes of becoming a great classical painter.

The anime series is notable for being the first official entry in the World Masterpiece Theater series (Calpis Children's Theater at the time).

== Plot ==
In 1872, in the Flemish village of Hoboken in Belgium, a young boy named Nello Daas lives with his grandfather Jehan, having lost his parents at an early age. The two earn their living by transporting milk from their village to the nearby city of Antwerp. After finishing their work each day, Nello spends time with his childhood friend Alois, and although their life is poor, they live modestly and contentedly.

One day, while accompanying his grandfather to Antwerp, Nello encounters an elderly large dog that is being forced to pull heavy loads for a hardware merchant. The dog, Patrasche, draws Nello's concern, and when he later learns that the merchant has abandoned the weakened animal on a riverbank, Nello rescues him and brings him home. Although Patrasche initially shows fear toward humans, he gradually grows trusting in response to the kindness shown by Nello and his grandfather. In time, Patrasche begins to assist with the milk deliveries of his own accord, becoming an irreplaceable presence in the lives of both Nello and Alois.

Nello is an artist who admires the paintings of Rubens, and longs to see the painter's works displayed in the city's cathedral—The Elevation of the Cross and The Descent from the Cross—which, however, can be viewed only for a fee that the boy cannot afford.

As Nello deepens his interest in drawing and as Alois discovers her enjoyment of lace-making, it is decided that Alois will study abroad in England. Her father Cogez, a major landowner in the area, disapproves of the closeness developing between his only daughter and Nello. However, the following year Alois is forced to return due to illness and recovers thanks to Nello's closeness.

Some time later, Nello's grandfather dies, leaving Nello and Patrasche in deep grief. Shortly thereafter, a fire breaks out at the windmill on the Cogez estate. Because of his longstanding dislike of Nello, Cogez begins to suspect him of having caused the fire. The villagers, unable to oppose Cogez, cease to employ Nello for milk deliveries. Following the death of his grandfather, the loss of his livelihood, and his loss in a long-cherished drawing competition, Nello falls into despair and loses the will to live.

At this time, Patrasche finds a purse containing a large sum of money that Cogez has dropped. Nello returns it to the Cogez household. Although Alois and her mother Elina are grateful and attempt to invite him inside, Nello refuses, leaves Patrasche in their care, and returns home, where he departs after leaving behind a note and all of his remaining possessions. When Cogez later learns that the returned purse was delivered by the boy he had long treated harshly, he is filled with remorse and resolves to make amends.

On Christmas night, after hearing from the mill worker Noel that Nello was innocent, Cogez and the villagers set out to apologize to him. A judge from the painting competition also comes to take Nello in. However, Nello has already disappeared. Despite their frantic search, they are unable to find him in time.

Patrasche escapes from the Cogez household and discovers Nello collapsed in the cathedral while gazing at paintings by Rubens. Nello says to him, "Patrasche, you must be tired. I am tired too. Somehow, I feel very sleepy." They then pass away, departing for heaven, escorted by a host of angels, where Nello's parents and grandfather await them, and where they are said to live together in eternal peace, free from suffering.

== Cast and characters ==
=== Main ===
- Michie Kita as Nello Daas - a poor and honest orphan, the main character. Ages 8–9.
- Patrasche - Nello's faithful dog.
- Reiko Katsura, Yōko Asagami (eps 1–2), Yoshiko Matsuo (ep 12) as Alois - a cheerful young girl who is Nello's best friend. Ages 5–7.
- Hirō Oikawa as Grandpa Jehan Daas - Nello's kind grandfather.

=== Villagers ===
- Tamio Ōki as Baas Cogez - Alois' proud father, the rich landowner of the village, who despises Nello's poverty.
- Taeko Nakanishi as Elina - Alois' gentle mother who supports her friendship with Nello.
- Yasuo Muramatsu as Hans - Cogez's petty servant who uses Nello as a scapegoat.
- Chieko Ichikawa as Greta - Hans' wife.
- Sumiko Shirakawa as Andre - Hans' good but cowardly son.
- Dax - Andre's dachshund.
- Haru Endō as Nulette - an elderly lady who is a neighbor and is fond of Nello.
- Kuro - Nulette's duck.
- Tetsuo Mizutori as Jestas - a kind farmer for whom Nello sells milk.
- Reiko Suzuki as Isabel - Jestas' wife.
- Takeshi Nakamura as Helmond - an opportunistic farmer who refuses Nello's work for a cheaper service.
- Kōji Yada as Sergio - a vegetable vendor who inadvertently replaces Nello's work.

=== Antwerp ===
- Kuriko Komamura as George - a lively 12-year-old boy who is a friend of Nello.
- Masako Sugaya as Paul - George's 6-year-old brother.
- Toku Nishio as Milk Delivery Person
- Yoko Yamaoka as Stephan - the son of a rich man who wins the drawing prize instead of Nello.
- Art supply store owner

=== Others ===
- Masashi Amenomori as Michele - a woodcutter friend of Nello.
- Ichirō Nagai as Noel - a windmill craftsman.
- Donkey Duke - Noel's donkey.
- Shōzō Iizuka as Hardware Store Owner - the cruel former owner of Patrasche.
- Haruko Kitahama as Lady - a rich woman who befriends Nello and tells him about Rubens' paintings.
- Yoshiko Fuita as Mylene - Nulette's daughter.
- Kei Tomiyama as Claude - Mylene's husband.
- Sophia - Cogez's elegant younger sister.
- Mari Okamoto as Annie - Sophia's snobbish daughter and Alois' cousin.
- Teiji Ōmiya as Danton - Cogez's business colleague.
- Kinto Tamura as Bertrand - the doctor who treats Alois when she returns sick from England.
- Iemasa Kayumi as Hendrick Ray - a drawing competition judge, who gives drawing advice to Nello. He claims that Nello wins the prize but is overwhelmed by the other judges and then decides to tutor him.
- Nello's mother - died when he was two, appears in flashbacks.
- Judges of the drawing competition

== Production ==
The animators conducted extensive research on 19th century Flanders, although it has to be said that a lot of features in the series are not Flemish but typically Dutch. The buildings depicted in the series were modeled after the Bokrijk open-air museum. Although there have been some changes from the original story by Marie Louise de la Ramée, it has been faithful in keeping the storyline accurate.

Isao Takahata and Hayao Miyazaki also worked on the series, respectively as storyboard artist and key animator for episode 15.

Dog of Flanders aired on Fuji TV between January 5 and December 28, 1975. Having gone into production before Zuiyo Eizo and Nippon Animation division, episodes #1–26 of the anime were still originally credited to Zuiyo and broadcast in the Calpis Comic Theater series. In subsequent DVD releases Calpis Children's Theater title card was kept in all 52 episodes.

== Music ==
- "Yoake-no Michi" (よあけのみち), opening theme (and ending theme in episodes 1–8), lyrics written by Eriko Kishida, music by Takeo Watanabe, arrangements by Yushi Matsuyama, sung by Kumiko Ōsugi.
- "Dokomademo arukou ne" (どこまでもあるこうね), ending theme (from episode 9), lyrics written by Eriko Kishida, music by Takeo Watanabe, arrangements by Yushi Matsuyama, sung by Kumiko Ōsugi.

== International broadcast ==
The series was aired in several countries and regions, including South Korea (on TBC from August to November 1976, later on KBS1TV from September 1981 to January 1982 and again from January to April 1982, and on EBS in 2007), Hong Kong (on TVB in July 1977), Taiwan (on CTV in 1979), Spain (on TVE beginning 17 October 1977, with a redub by Telecinco in November 1991), Germany (on Sat.1 from April 1984 to May 1985), Italy (on Rai 1 from June to September 1984), and Austria (on ORF in 1986). It also aired in parts of the Arab world and the Philippines, achieving particular success across Asia. However, it was never broadcast in Belgium, where the story is set, nor in the UK or the US, despite English being the language of the original novel.

For the European release, the distribution rights were acquired by the German company Taurus Film in 1977. The series underwent several modifications: the original Japanese soundtrack was completely replaced with new music composed by Otto K. Reppert, and character names were altered—Nello and Alois were renamed Niklaas and Aneka in the German version, while in the 1991 Spanish redub they became Nicolás and Marta. The finale was also significantly edited, with scenes such as Alois running in terror, presaging the imminent death of her friend, her desperate cry, the cathedral candles going out, and the descent of angels symbolizing Nello and Patrasche's death removed; the ending was reworked as a dream, suggesting that the protagonists lived happily upon waking. The Italian broadcast, imported from the German version but retaining the original Japanese music and most character names, was aired only once, and it is unclear whether it included the European edits to the final episode.

== Reception ==
The series enjoyed great popularity in Japan. The final scene in particular is remembered by viewers as one of the most moving in the history of television. According to data from Video Research, the final episode recorded a 30.1% audience rating in the Kantō region, the highest figure ever achieved within the World Masterpiece Theater series. In the period leading up to the conclusion, the broadcaster Fuji TV also received an exceptionally large number of responses from viewers: more than one thousand letters were sent following the broadcast of episode 44, expressing sympathy over the death of Nello's grandfather; and ahead of the final episode, aired on 28 December 1975, many viewers who were familiar with the ending of the original novel sent appeals requesting that Nello and Patrasche be spared. In response to these reactions, the network's public relations department stated its intention to "ensure an ending that could give dreams to children," while still having to decide whether to adhere to the novel's conclusion. Ultimately, the position of Calpis president Fujio Dochakura — a devout Christian — prevailed; according to his view, death does not represent an end but rather a triumphant return to heaven. This perspective led to the scene in which Nello and Patrasche are welcomed by angels.

=== Critical response ===
Hayao Miyazaki, who was marginally involved in the production of the series, later expressed a critical view of the work, stating: "Despite having achieved good ratings, I consider it a work of little value."

== Episode list ==
No.	Title	Original release date
1	"Boy Nello"; Transliteration: "Shōnen Nero" (少年ネロ)	January 5, 1975
Little Nello works with his grandfather Jehan delivering milk in Antwerp, leading a poor but happy life. One day he witnesses the cruelty of an itinerant hardware peddler who forces a dog to pull his cart, beating it brutally. Deeply affected, Nello tries to help the animal by offering it water, but he is driven away by the owner.
2	"With Alois to the Forest"; Transliteration: "Aroa to mori he" (アロアと森へ)	January 12, 1975
Grandfather Jehan goes alone to deliver the milk to the city, while Nello gathers strawberries in the woods with his friend Alois. Caught by a thunderstorm, the two take shelter with Michel, a woodcutter, and Alois discovers Nello's passion for drawing for the first time. Meanwhile, the girl's parents grow worried, but when the storm ends, Nello accompanies her safely back home.
3	"In the Town of Antwerp"; Transliteration: "Antowāpu no machi de" (アントワープの町で)	January 19, 1975
On the road to Antwerp, Nello meets a man who is sketching the cathedral and receives from him his first lessons in painting. Inside the cathedral, where his grandfather is waiting for him, he notices the Assumption of the Virgin, which reminds him of his deceased mother; his grandfather reveals that that day marks the sixth anniversary of her death. In the evening, before falling asleep, Nello reflects on his experiences in the city, especially on the poor dog he cannot get out of his mind.
4	"New Friend"; Transliteration: "Atarashii tomodachi" (新しい友達)	January 26, 1975
Nello goes to the river to fish, where he meets the lively brothers George and Paul. When Paul accidentally falls into the water, Nello dives in to save him despite not knowing how to swim. George thanks him, and from that moment a sincere friendship develops between him and Nello.
5	"Patrasche"; Transliteration: "Patorasshu" (パトラッシュ)	February 2, 1975
Nello is led by George and Paul to their secret hideout, a dilapidated building. From there he once again witnesses the hardware peddler's cruelty toward his dog and later learns that the animal is called Patrasche. Taking advantage of a moment of distraction on the part of the owner, and with the help of his friends, he manages to give the dog something to drink.
6	"Don't Give Up, Patrasche"; Transliteration: "Ganbare Patorasshu" (がんばれパトラッシュ)	February 9, 1975
Nello goes into the city in search of Patrasche. Meanwhile, exhausted by labor and deprived of food and water, the dog loses consciousness and is abandoned by the hardware peddler. Upon learning of this, Nello searches for him desperately and manages to find him, watching over him throughout the night in an attempt to save his life.
7	"Eat Your Soup"; Transliteration: "supu woonomi" (スープをおのみ)	February 16, 1975
Thanks to Nello's attentive care, Patrasche manages to survive. The boy gives him an infusion made from his grandfather's medicinal herbs and, with the little money he has, has a meat soup prepared for him. Gradually, the dog begins to recover.
8	"He Barked, Grampa"; Transliteration: "hoetayoojiisan" (ほえたよおじいさん)	February 23, 1975
Marked by the cruelty he has endured, Patrasche is initially afraid of the grandfather and of Alois, but thanks to Nello's kindness and the food Alois brings him, he quickly gains confidence. The two children build him a kennel, and when the grandfather returns, Patrasche runs and barks happily, surprising everyone.
9	"Bell of Memories"; Transliteration: "omoideno suzu" (おもいでの鈴)	March 2, 1975
Patrasche has fully regained his strength. Nello, his grandfather, and Alois take him into the city, but out of habit the dog tries to pull their cart. Along the way they meet George and Paul, and once in the city a merchant warns Nello to be careful of the fearsome hardware peddler. Shortly afterward, he and his friends come face to face with the cruel man but manage to escape. The following morning, Jehan gives Nello a collar for Patrasche, fitted with the bell that his mother had given him.
10	"Alois' Brooch"; Transliteration: "aroa no burochi" (アロアのブローチ)	March 9, 1975
Patrasche is taken by Nello and Alois into the woods, where he can run freely. While they are playing, Alois loses a brooch, which Nello fortunately manages to find after searching for it for a long time.
11	"Elina's Garden"; Transliteration: "erina no hanahata" (エリーナの花畑)	March 16, 1975
Elina's tulip field, Alois' mother, is damaged by a dog. Hans, Nello's landlord, immediately blames Patrasche and scolds the boy severely. In the end, George and Paul discover that the true culprit is Dax, Andre's dachshund, Hans' son.
12	"Grampa's Small Pot"; Transliteration: "ojiisanno chiisa na tsubo" (おじいさんの小さな壺)	March 23, 1975
Patrasche continues to insist on pulling the cart, so Grandfather Jehan accommodates him by building a harness. In the city, the hardware peddler tries to force Nello to hand over the dog. The grandfather manages to reach an agreement with him to buy Patrasche for three francs, to be paid in installments, without Nello's knowledge.
13	"Windmill from Napoleon's Times"; Transliteration: "Naporeon jidai no fūsha" (ナポレオン時代の風車)	March 30, 1975
Due to a storm, the windmill stops turning. The village landowner, Cogez, Alois' father, hires Noel, an eccentric but highly skilled craftsman, to carry out the repairs. Nello, fascinated, watches the work. When the windmill begins to turn again, he notices Andre hanging from a sail and acts quickly to prevent a potential accident.
14	"Picture Painted in the Night Sky"; Transliteration: "Yozora ni egaita e" (夜空に描いた絵)	April 6, 1975
Grandfather Jehan talks with the neighbors about Nello's future, imagining a life for him as a farmer or woodcutter. Nello, however, dreams of becoming a painter: although he wishes to follow his grandfather's wishes, his desire to create works as beautiful as the painting in the church continues to grow.
15	"Old Account Book"; Transliteration: "Furui chōbo" (古い帳簿)	April 13, 1975
Alois gives Nello an old ledger from her home while he is drawing on a board. However, the ledger is needed for Cogez's work. It is returned immediately, but one of the most important pages has been torn, and Nello is suspected of being responsible. Later, Cogez finds the page among his papers, and Alois is finally able to give the notebook back to Nello.
16	"10-centime Picture Album"; Transliteration: "10 sanchīmu no shaseichō" (10サンチームの写生帳)	April 20, 1975
Nello quickly fills the notebook given to him by Alois with drawings, using it up in a short time. In the city, he notices blank drawing sheets for sale. To obtain them, Nello goes to work for the woodcutter Michel, and only through this effort does he finally manage to get them.
17	"Under the Tree on top of the Hill"; Transliteration: "Oka no ue no ki no shita de" (丘の上の木の下で)	April 27, 1975
Nello is thrilled with his sketchbook and tries to draw the buildings of Antwerp, but he is so nervous that he cannot succeed. On the way back, Alois suggests that he draw Patrasche, and this time Nello manages it. The two promise to meet the next day under the tree: Nello will show the finished drawing, and Alois has a surprise for him. Despite the rain, they meet as promised, and at the end of the storm, Nello reveals the completed drawing and Alois shows her lace embroidery.
18	"Kuro the Prankster"; Transliteration: "Itazurakko no kuro" (いたずらっ子のクロ)	May 4, 1975
Nulette, Nello's neighbor, is supposed to move in with her daughter Mylene, but she does not want to leave her home and her animals. When her duck, Kuro, goes missing, Nello and Alois search for it. Patrasche rescues the duck after it becomes trapped in a hole and is at risk of falling into the river. Mylene can now be reassured: her mother has truly kind neighbors.
19	"A Hardware Salesman is in Town"; Transliteration: "Kanamonoya ga mura ni" (金物屋が村に)	May 11, 1975
The day arrives when Grandfather must pay the hardware peddler the agreed price for Patrasche. He finally brings the money he has saved, but he arrives too late: the peddler, tired of waiting, has already taken Patrasche away. Nello and his grandfather search for him in the village, but in vain.
20	"As Far as Possible"; Transliteration: "Doko made mo" (どこまでも)	May 18, 1975
The following morning, Nello goes into the city to search for the hardware peddler and Patrasche, helped by George and Paul, but the dog seems to have vanished. On the way back, his grandfather suddenly feels dizzy. Determined to find Patrasche, Nello sets out again on his own. The next day, Patrasche picks up Nello's scent, manages to break free from the cruel peddler, and finds him exhausted from fatigue. Using their last remaining strength, the two make their way home together.
21	"Guest Who Arrived by Ship"; Transliteration: "Fune de kita okyakusama" (船で来たお客さま)	May 25, 1975
Alois' aunt, Sophia, arrives from England with her daughter Annie. Impressed by Annie's education, Alois' father suggests sending his own daughter to study in England. Nello feels sad, convinced he will never see his friend again, while Alois objects. In the end, Cogez postpones his daughter's departure, and the two children are overjoyed.
22	"Present from England"; Transliteration: "Igirisu kara no okurimono" (イギリスからの贈り物)	June 1, 1975
Nello dreams that Alois is leaving for England on a ship. Later, when Alois gives him one of the two glass spheres that Annie sent her from England, Nello says he will accept it only when she has departed. The gesture, intended as thoughtful, angers the girl, who believes she is unwelcome to her friend and to her parents. Afterwards, her mother explains that the departure is for her own good, and Alois decides to make peace with Nello, while remaining opposed to the idea of leaving.
23	"Alois' Birthday"; Transliteration: "Aroa no tanjōbi" (アロアの誕生日)	June 8, 1975
For Alois' birthday, Grandfather gives Nello some money to buy her a gift. In the city, however, he cannot find anything suitable, so he goes into the woods and gathers Alois' favorite flowers to give her. During the celebration, a valuable vase is accidentally broken by Dax, which angers Alois' father greatly, and Nello is unfairly blamed. Later, Alois asks Nello to draw her, and soon the upset is forgotten.
24	"Alois' Picture"; Transliteration: "Aroa no e" (アロアの絵)	June 15, 1975
Nello helps the villagers harvest the crops together with his friends. When his grandfather takes over, he can finally begin sketching Alois, but he is interrupted by her father, who scolds him for wasting time on frivolities. Cogez still offers him a coin for the portrait, which hurts Nello, and he refuses. That evening, Alois also learns that her father intends to send her to England as soon as possible.
25	"Alois is Gone"; Transliteration: "Aroa ga inai" (アロアがいない)	June 22, 1975
Alois runs away from home because her father wants to send her to England, causing a commotion in the village. Patrasche finds her at the windmill, and although saddened by the impending separation, Nello manages to convince her that her father's decision is for her own good.
26	"Goodbye, Alois"; Transliteration: "Sayōnara Aroa" (さようならアロア)	June 29, 1975
Nello and Alois meet at a market stall to study the maps. On the chart, the distance between Antwerp and England is barely the span of a thumb and forefinger, which reassures the two children. On the day of departure, Nello almost misses the chance to say goodbye to Alois because Hans sends him away with an excuse, but thanks to George's warning, he manages to see her off as the ship sails away.
27	"Christmas without Alois"; Transliteration: "Aroa no inai kurisumasu" (アロアのいないクリスマス)	July 6, 1975
A month has passed since Alois left the village, and Nello eagerly awaits a letter from her. A letter finally arrives addressed to her parents, which also contains a Christmas gift for Nello, but Cogez wants to open it before handing it over. After the Christmas Mass, Nello celebrates with his grandfather and Nulette, and receives Alois' gift from Elina: a set of colored chalks.
28	"A Kind Lady"; Transliteration: "Shinsetsu na kifujin" (親切な貴婦人)	July 13, 1975
On the road to Antwerp, a wheel of Nello and his grandfather's cart breaks, and they are helped by a kind lady passing by with her carriage. Later, Nello goes to the cathedral to speak with Alois through the painting of the Virgin Mary, as she had suggested in her letter. There he meets the lady again, who accompanies him to visit the art museum. The boy is enchanted by Rubens' paintings and discovers that the Virgin painting also belongs to him, and that the cathedral houses two more of his works.
29	"Two Pictures of Rubens"; Transliteration: "Rubensu no ni-mai no e" (ルーベンスの2枚の絵)	July 20, 1975
After his work, Nello goes to the cathedral to see the other two Rubens paintings the lady had told him about, but he discovers that they are covered by curtains and can only be viewed for a fee. Following George's suggestion, he tries to wait for someone to pay to see them, but without success, and he feels saddened.
30	"Promise in the Snow"; Transliteration: "Yuki no naka no yakusoku" (雪の中の約束)	July 27, 1975
In Antwerp, Nello meets again the lady who had helped him. She tells him about her deceased son and, knowing how much he loves to draw, suggests that they view the cathedral's paintings together before her departure. Happy, Nello agrees, but his grandfather falls ill, and he arrives too late: the lady has already left. Thanks to George, however, he receives a letter in which she wishes him well and hopes that one day they can admire the paintings together.
31	"Nello's Decision"; Transliteration: "Nero no ketsui" (ネロの決意)	August 3, 1975
The woodcutter Michel injures his leg, and Nello spends the night in his cabin to take care of him. The next day, Noel visits and asks Nello what he wants to become when he grows up, but the boy does not yet know. While gathering firewood, Nello notices the large oak that Michel was supposed to cut down to allow Noel to repair the windmill, and he decides to take care of it himself.
32	"A Big Oak Tree"; Transliteration: "Ōki na kashi no ki" (大きなカシの木)	August 10, 1975
Nello continues to cut down the oak on his own while caring for Michel. Meanwhile, Cogez, convinced by Hans that the woodcutter is not working because of the boy, complains to his grandfather. Despite the effort, Nello finally succeeds in felling the tree, making his grandfather proud and allowing Noel to repair the windmill.
33	"Letter from the Heart"; Transliteration: "Kokoro no tegami" (こころの手紙)	August 17, 1975
Michel confides to the grandfather that he wants Nello to live with him so he can become a woodcutter, but he cannot bring himself to talk to the boy about it. Meanwhile, Nulette, overexerting herself, worsens her neuralgia and, although saddened to leave Nello and Jehan, decides to move in with her daughter.
34	"Mrs Nulette"; Transliteration: "Nuretto obasan" (ヌレットおばさん)	August 24, 1975
On the day of the move, Nulette entrusts her duck, Kuro, to Nello, asking him to take care of it. Nello promises to raise it with care and bids farewell to the woman who has been like a mother to him. Shortly afterward, Andre tells him that Alois is about to return.
35	"Welcome Back, Alois"; Transliteration: "Okaeri Aroa" (お帰りアロア)	August 31, 1975
When Nello goes to the port to welcome Alois, she is not there, and her parents receive a worrying letter from the doctor. Some time later, George and Paul inform him that Alois is in the hospital. Not wanting to be seen as ill, she asks Nello to bring her one of his drawings instead, and later the two friends exchange a brief greeting at the window.
36	"Alois' Medicine"; Transliteration: "Aroa no kusuri" (アロアのくすり)	September 7, 1975
Alois' illness does not improve, and the girl is troubled by dreams featuring Nello and Patrasche. The doctor determines that the cause is the loneliness from being away from home and advises her parents to let her return to the open air of the village. Nello tries to bring her some herbs, but Hans drives him away; the doctor reiterates that being close to her friend is the best medicine. Elina gives the herbs to Alois, and when Nello goes to see her, he finds that she has recovered.
37	"Good News"; Transliteration: "Ureshii shirase" (うれしい知らせ)	September 14, 1975
The doctor determines that Alois has fully recovered, thanks in part to Nello's presence, although her father refuses to admit it and tries to keep them apart. He wants to send her back to school, but the doctor advises him not to rush things. Meanwhile, a drawing competition is announced in Antwerp, offering a prize of 200 francs and the opportunity to study art. Cogez thanks Nello for helping with his daughter's recovery, but when he learns that Nello will enter the competition, he belittles him, calling him idle.
38	"Nello's Big Dream"; Transliteration: "Nero no ōki na yume" (ネロの大きな夢)	September 21, 1975
Having spent the night drawing, Nello wakes up late and accepts a ride from Alois on her cart as Hans takes her to school in Antwerp. As a result, the girl arrives late, and an angry Cogez calls Jehan to reprimand him because Nello is devoted to drawing instead of work. The grandfather, however, defends his grandson's dream and says nothing to him so as not to worry him.
39	"Flag Connecting Two Hearts"; Transliteration: "Kokoro o tsunagu futatsu no hata" (心をつなぐ二つの旗)	September 28, 1975
Although they go to Antwerp every day, Nello and Alois are able to see each other only rarely; what keeps them connected are the two white flags that George and Paul always raise for them. One day, Alois' cart breaks down, and she is accompanied to the city by Nello and his grandfather; on the way back, she walks home alone and realizes the effort involved in Nello's daily journey. The following day, Cogez again catches Nello drawing with Alois and scolds him, accusing him of wasting time, while the grandfather secretly works at the market after delivering the milk.
40	"Grampa's Whistling"; Transliteration: "Ojiisan no kuchibue" (おじいさんの口笛)	October 5, 1975
Nello is shocked to discover that his grandfather has been selling vegetables at the market without his knowledge. Jehan assures him that the work is not a burden, but seeing him tired, Nello insists on helping. Meanwhile, Nello feels discouraged because the canvases required for the competition are too expensive. One evening, his grandfather returns home late and gives him a canvas, making him happy, but shortly afterward he is struck by illness from overexertion.
41	"Familiar Long Road"; Transliteration: "Natsukashii nagai michi" (なつかしい長い道)	October 12, 1975
After Jehan faints, he is confined to bed, and Nello takes care of everything, giving up practice for the competition. The grandfather regrets not being able to help him and, aware that their time together is limited, makes the effort to accompany him to work whenever he can.
42	"Person Who Arrived Next Door"; Transliteration: "Tonari ni kita hito" (となりに来た人)	October 19, 1975
The grandfather's condition worsens, and he is once again confined to bed. The situation is further complicated by the arrival of a new neighbor, Sergio, who promises to deliver the villagers' milk for free in exchange for buying their vegetables at a discounted price. As a result, Nello finds himself almost without work, with only Jestas remaining as a loyal customer.
43	"Alois' Help"; Transliteration: "Aroa no otetsudai" (アロアのおてつだい)	October 26, 1975
Without telling his grandfather about the decline in his work as a milk delivery boy, Nello begins working as a porter at the port with George's help. Meanwhile, Alois decides to take care of Grandfather Jehan, but accidentally reveals the truth to him.
44	"Grampa's Gift"; Transliteration: "Ojiisan e no omiyage" (おじいさんへのおみやげ)	November 2, 1975
On his last day of work at the port, Nello uses his earnings to buy a large piece of meat and prepare a soup for his grandfather, who is deeply moved. Jehan reveals that he knew about the work, affectionately praises him, and dies shortly afterward in his grandson's distraught arms. The next day, Alois waits in vain for Nello at her birthday party; when he does not arrive, she goes to look for him and finds him at his grandfather's grave, where they mourn his death together.
45	"Nello Alone"; Transliteration: "Hitoribocchi no Nero" (ひとりぼっちのネロ)	November 9, 1975
After learning of Jehan's death, George and Paul are also deeply saddened. Nello's loneliness grows when he discovers that George must move to another city to work as an apprentice Kurosmith. Before parting, the three children organize a small farewell party at Nello's home, and George asks his friend to take care of his younger brother during his absence.
46	"Grampa's Face"; Transliteration: "Ojiisan no kao" (おじいさんの顔)	November 16, 1975
With the support of his friends, Nello recovers, but he struggles to begin the drawing for the competition. Seeing the portrait of his grandfather made by Alois, he realizes that he wants to draw him as well. Now left alone at home with Patrasche and Kuro, he refuses Michel's invitation to move in with him, determined to stay until he has completed his grandfather's portrait.
47	"Fire at the Windmill Hut"; Transliteration: "Fūsha koya no kaji" (風車小屋の火事)	November 23, 1975
Nello has begun the drawing for the competition, depicting his grandfather together with Patrasche. Elina tries to speak in his favor to her husband, but Cogez misunderstands and thinks he must find Nello a job to keep him away from his daughter. That evening, Nello brings Alois a doll he found near the river. During the night, the windmill catches fire, and Hans accuses him of being responsible. Alois defends him by explaining what he had been doing, but this only angers her father further, who forbids Nello from seeing her.
48	"No More Work"; Transliteration: "Nakunatta shigoto" (なくなった仕事)	November 30, 1975
The villagers, influenced by Cogez's outburst, are angry with Nello over the fire that destroyed the crops. Even Jestas, his last remaining customer, gives in to the pressure from the townspeople, leaving the boy without any earnings. Alois is distressed by his situation and confronts her father, whom she holds responsible. Nello's only comfort comes from thinking of his distant friends, and with renewed courage, he continues to draw.
49	"I Finished Drawing, Grampa"; Transliteration: "Egaketa yo ojiisan" (描けたよおじいさん)	December 7, 1975
At last, the painting for the competition is finished. Nello goes to Antwerp with Paul to deliver it to the town hall and, on the way back, temporarily entrusts Kuro to him. Upon returning home, he finds Michel determined to take him in, but Nello wants to know the outcome of the competition first.
50	"Day of the Announcement"; Transliteration: "Happyō no hi" (発表の日)	December 14, 1975
As the day of the announcement approaches, Nello and Alois impatiently count the days. George visits Nello and asks him to leave Kuro with his younger brother, who will feel lonely without him, and Nello agrees. Shortly afterward, Hans orders Nello to leave the cabin so as not to anger the villagers, but he asks to stay at least until Christmas. With the last of his money, Nello visits a Rubens exhibition. Finally, Christmas Eve arrives, the day of the announcement, but Nello is not the winner of the first prize.
51	"Two-thousand Francs Cash"; Transliteration: "Nisen furan no kinka" (二千フランの金貨)	December 21, 1975
With no money left for food, Patrasche weakens from hunger, and Nello is desperate. Meanwhile, Cogez loses a bag containing 2,000 francs in the snow, which Patrasche finds and Nello returns. The boy then entrusts Patrasche to the care of Alois and Elina and sets off, determined to leave the village. Upon learning what happened, Cogez feels deeply grateful to Nello and ashamed of his own behavior. At that moment, Noel arrives, and Patrasche manages to escape from home to search for his friend.
52	"Picture of the Angels"; Transliteration: "Tenshi-tachi no e" (天使たちの絵)	December 28, 1975
Noel reveals that the windmill fire was caused by poor maintenance and that Nello is innocent. Michel, Nulette, and George return for the holidays, and the villagers go to Nello's home to apologize, but find only a farewell letter. A judge from the competition, who had voted for Nello and is determined to become his mentor, also arrives, and everyone sets out to find him. Meanwhile, Patrasche finds Nello in the cathedral of Antwerp, where the boy finally gets to see Rubens' paintings. Exhausted, the two friends fall asleep embracing. Alois, struck by a bad premonition, runs through the snow calling for Nello. In the church, angels descend to take Nello and Patrasche and lead them to Heaven, to be reunited with Grandfather Jehan and Nello's mother, where they will live happily forever.

== References in other media ==
The main opening theme song has always been popular in Japan since the series' debut. It was featured in a daydream sequence in the live action adaptation of Nodame Cantabile, starring Juri Ueno and Hiroshi Tamaki, with the character of Nodame singing the song while taking a bath. It was also used in the anime adaptation of Re:Zero -Starting Life in Another World- as protagonist Subaru Natsuki's ringtone.

A series of trailers for the 2023 video game Resident Evil 4 that parodied Dog of Flanders were released to coincide with the game's release.

== Film ==
A feature film remake of the series, titled The Dog of Flanders or The Dog of Flanders: The Movie (劇場版 フランダースの犬, Gekijōban Furandāsu no Inu) was released in March 1997, distributed by Shochiku. Like the TV series, it is directed by Yoshio Kuroda and produced by Nippon Animation. The film was released on VHS in 1999 and later released on DVD in March 2000.

On July 31, 2026, AnimEigo announced at Otakon they had rescued the film and planned to re-release it on Blu-ray in late 2027.

=== Overview ===
In producing the theatrical film, the creators largely retained the setting of the previously mentioned television series, while introducing original adaptations and directorial choices, such as a memoir-like narrative structure in which Nello's childhood friend Alois reflects on the past after reaching adulthood. Differences are also evident in the depiction of the final moments of Nello and Patrasche, and the film does not employ narration. The ending portrays the adult Alois hearing Nello's voice within a vision and renewing her resolve for the future. The lyrics of the ending theme likewise function as an epilogue from Alois' perspective. These changes were reportedly made in reflection on the comparatively limited development of Alois' character in the latter part of the television series.

The music and visuals were also renewed, and the scenery was depicted in a manner closer to that of Flanders at the time. Computer-generated imagery was used in some scenes. The voice cast was changed as well.

=== Plot ===
Alois, now grown and having become a nun, visits Antwerp Cathedral and reflects on her memories from twenty years earlier—from the time she became close to Nello and Patrasche through to their deaths.

=== Cast ===
- Makoto Tsumura/Brady Bluhm as Nello Daas
- Sakura Tange/Debi Derryberry as Alois
- Kousei Yagi/Robert Loggia as Grandpa Jehan Daas
- Honami Suzuki/Sean Young as the adult/Sister Alois
- Katsumi Toriumi/Richard Cansino as the adult Paul
- Yuriko Fuchizaki/Lara Cody as the young Paul
- Masato Hirano/Randy Montgomery as Hans
- Toshiyuki Morikawa/Scott Menville as the adult George
- Yoshiko Kamei/Ryan O'Donohue as the young George
- Yuko Sasaki as Nello's mother
- Bob Papenbrook as Ansole
- Sherry Lynn as Elina
- Michael McConnohie as Cogez
- Matt K. Miller as Mr. Ike
- Chris Carroll as Art Store Owner
- Louise Chamis as Mrs. Nulette
- Brianne Siddall as Stephen
- Paul St. Peter as Art Judge #1
- Cliff Wells as Art Judge #2
- Mari Devon as Mrs. Jestas

Voices for orphan children provided by Jessica Evans, Dylan Hart, Sophie Lechken, Alex Mandelberg, Bryce Papenbrook.

=== Reception ===
It grossed ¥243,543,645 at the box office.

== See also ==
- My Patrasche, Tokyo Movie Shinsha's adaptation of Marie Louise de la Ramée's novel
