= Eric Janvier =

French businessman (born 1962)

Éric Janvier
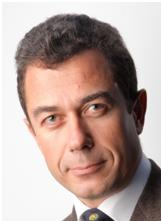
- Born: 26 January 1962 (age 64); La Châtre, France
- Education: École Polytechnique; HEC Paris
- Occupation: Businessman

Éric Janvier (born 26 January 1962) is a French businessman.

== Biography ==
A graduate of the École Polytechnique and HEC Paris MBA, Janvier was the co-founder of Schlumberger Business Consulting (SBC) and led the company's Capital Projects Practice. He was previously in charge of SBC business for Europe, the Confederation of Independent States and Africa.

Previously Janvier was a vice-president at Cambridge Technology Partners and from 1989 to 1999 was a partner at McKinsey & Company.
