= James D. McCabe =

American writer (1842–1883)

James Dabney McCabe Jr. (1842–1883) was an American writer. Along with his birth name, he also selectively used the pseudonym Edward Winslow Martin.

McCabe was born in Richmond, Virginia, on July 30, 1842, the son of Rev. James Dabney McCabe, a Methodist clergyman. He wrote histories and biographies as well as plays, poetry, and travel guides. His papers and correspondence are collected at Johns Hopkins University.

He died on January 27, 1883 in Germantown, Pennsylvania. His unfinished work includes biography of temperance leader Francis Murphy and "anecdotal histories" of the Mormons and the United States.

== Books ==
- The life and public services of Horatio Seymour: together with a complete and authentic life of Francis P. Blair, Jr. United States Publishing Company 1868
- Planting the Wilderness; The Pioneer Boys
- Life and campaigns of General Robert E. Lee The National Publishing Company 1870
- 1871: History of the War Between Germany and France. Philadelphia: The National Publishing Company, Jones Brothers and Co.
- Lights and shadows of New York life; or, The sights and sensations of the great city. A work descriptive of the city of New York in all its various phases National publishing company 1872
- New York by sunlight and gaslight: a work descriptive of the great American metropolis; its high and low life; its splendors and miseries; its virtues and vices; its gorgeous palaces and dark homes of poverty and crime; its public men, politicians, adventurers; its charities, frauds, mysteries, etc. Union Publishing House
- Cross and Crown; Sufferings and Triumphs of Heroic Men and Women Who Were Persecuted for True Religion of Jesus 1874
- The illustrated history of the Centennial exhibition, held in commemoration of the one hundredth anniversary of American independence The National publishing company 1876
- The history of the great riots : being a full and authentic account of the strikes and riots on the various railroads of the United States and in the mining regions 1877
- From the Farm to the Presidential Chair; The Life and Public Services of General James A. Garfield
