= Margaret Thomson Janvier =

American poet

- Born: c. 1844; New Orleans, Louisiana
- Died: 1913; Moorestown, New Jersey
- Relatives: Thomas Allibone Janvier (brother)
- Writing career
- Pen name: Margaret Vandegrift
- Genres: Poetry, children's literature

Margaret Thomson Janvier (1840s – 1913) was an American poet and author of children's literature who published under the pseudonym Margaret Vandegrift.

== Biography ==
Janvier was born in New Orleans, Louisiana, to Francis de Haes Janvier and Emma (Newbold) Janvier. Her brother was the writer Thomas Allibone Janvier. She was initially educated at home and in the public school system before, in 1859, entering the Moravian Female Seminary in Bethlehem, Pennsylvania. She lived most of her adult life in Moorestown, New Jersey.

Beginning around 1880, Janvier published collections of poetry, adventure novels, short stories, and fairy tales for young readers. Many of her adventure tales featured plucky protagonists — often girls — overcoming difficulties ranging from financial destitution to the death of a parent. Critics of the era praised her as "a most charming entertainer of children". E. B. Bensell illustrated two of her books.

In addition to publishing stand-alone books, Janvier wrote for popular periodicals such as St. Nicholas Magazine, Harper's Young People, and Century Magazine. One of her poems, "Little Wild Baby", which implied a mixed-race relationship between a white man and a woman of color, was rejected by major literary periodicals of its day.

== Selected publications ==
- Clover Beach (1880)
- Under the Dog Star (1881)
- Holidays at Home (1882)
- The Queen's Body Guard (1883)
- The Absent-Minded Fairy, and Other Verses (1884, illustrated by E. B. Bensell)
- Doris and Theodora (1884)
- Little Bell and Other Stories (1884, illustrated by E. B. Bensell)
- Rose Raymond's Wards (1885)
- Ways and Means (1886)
- The Dead Doll, and Other Verses (1888)
- Little Helpers (1888)
- Umbrellas to Mend (1905)
