= Janvier Maharangy =

Malagasy politician

Janvier Maharangy is a Malagasy politician. He was elected as member of the National Assembly of Madagascar in the 2007 Malagasy parliamentary elections for the Tiako I Madagasikara party. He represents the constituency of Morondava.
