= Mary Harriott Norris =

American novelist

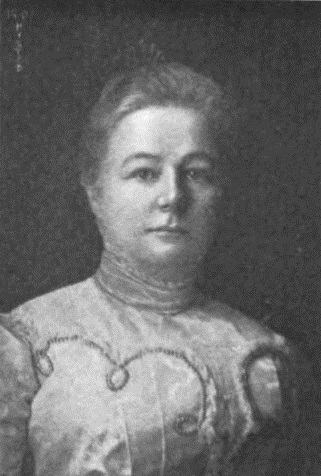
- Born: March 16, 1848; Boonton, New Jersey, U.S.
- Died: September 14, 1918 (aged 70); Morristown, New Jersey, U.S.
- Education: Vassar College (A.B.)
- Occupations: Writer, educator
- Parent(s): Charles Bryan Norris; Mary L. Kerr

Mary Harriott Norris (March 16, 1848 – September 14, 1918) was an American author and educator.

== Biography ==
Born in Boonton, New Jersey, to Charles Bryan Norris and Mary Lyon Kerr, Mary Harriott Norris was educated at Vassar College, where she graduated with honor, receiving an A.B. degree in 1870. Two years later in 1872 she was invited back to deliver the annual commencement address to the college. She became a writer of short stories, novels, and educational articles; she edited several works and gave a number of lectures. Norris was a regular contributor to the Boston Journal of Education.

In 1879, she became principal of a private school she founded in New York City, serving at that post until 1891. From 1898 to 1899, she served as Dean of Women at Northwestern University, being the first regularly elected representative to hold that post. She travelled to Europe three times, visiting Great Britain, Italy, the Scandinavian countries, Netherlands, and Switzerland.

== Bibliography ==
Her published works include the following:

- Fräulein Mina (1872)
- School-life of Ben and Bentie (1884)
- Dorothy Delafield (1886)
- A Damsel of the Eighteenth Century (1889)
- Phoebe (1890)
- Silas Marner (1890), editor
- Marmion (1891), editor
- Afterward (1893)
- The Nine Blessings (1893)
- John Applegate, Surgeon (1894)
- Lakewood (1895)
- Evangeline (1897), editor
- Kenilworth (1898), editor
- The Gray House of the Quarries (1898)
- Quentin Duward (1899), editor
- The Grapes of Wrath (1901)
- The Story of Christina (1907)
- The Veil (1907)
- The Golden Age of Vassar (1915)
