= Edmund H. Garrett =

American painter, illustrator and author (1853–1929)

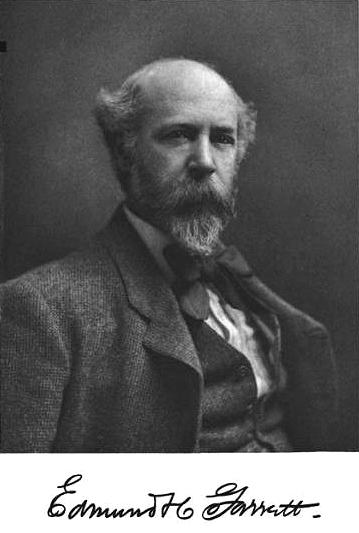
- Portrait of Garrett, c. 1904
- Born: October 19, 1853; Albany, New York, US
- Died: April 2, 1929 (aged 75); Needham, Massachusetts, US

Edmund Henry Garrett (1853–1929) was an American illustrator, bookplate-maker, and author—as well as a highly respected painter—renowned for his illustrations of the legends of King Arthur.

== Biography ==
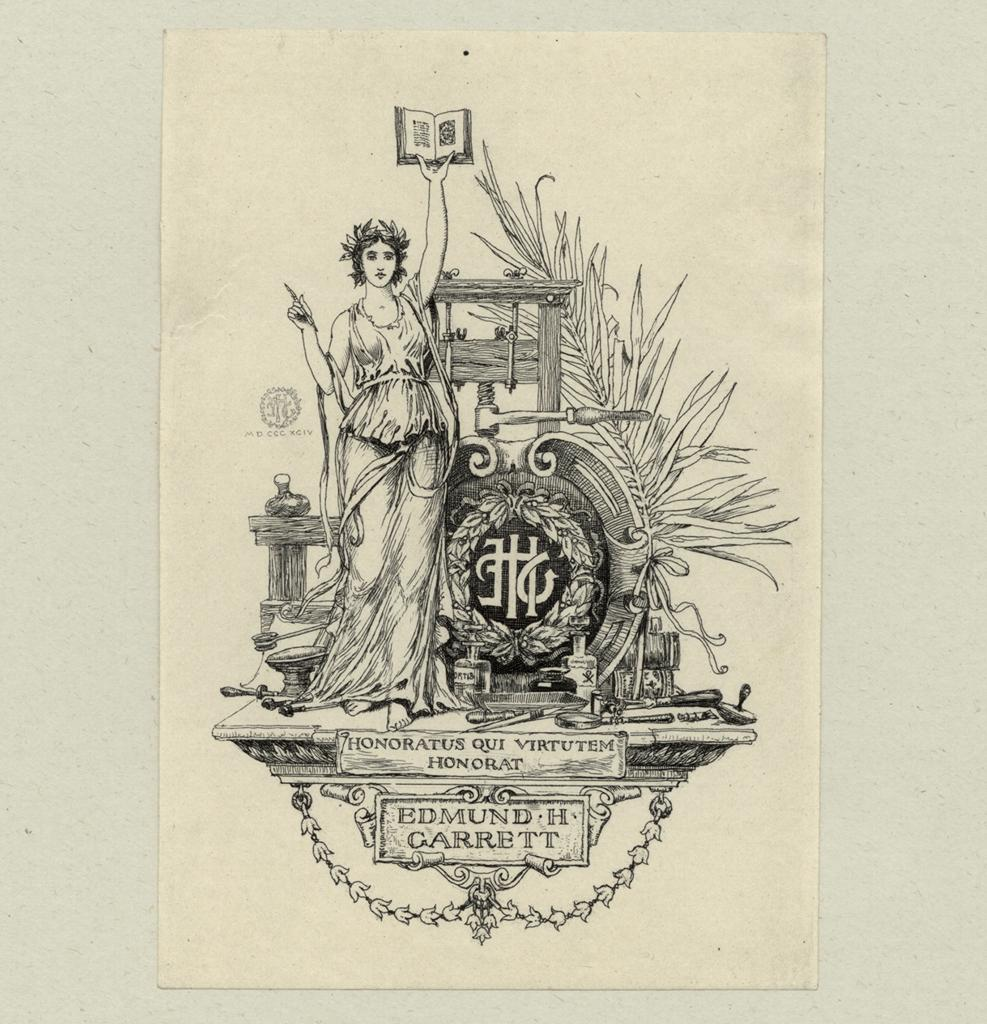
Edmund H. Garrett's bookplate, which he designed. A woman resembling a Muse is surrounded by printing tools. The motto reads "Honoratus Qui Virtutem Honorat"

Garrett was born in Albany, New York on October 19, 1853. While little is known of his initial art education, Garrett rose through the ranks to become a distinguished member of the Boston Art Club and the Copley Society of Art, and was an acquaintance and colleague of renowned impressionist artist Childe Hassam. He studied at the Académie Julian in Paris under Gustave Boulanger, Jules Lefebvre, John Paul Laurens, and Hector Leroux. After residing in Paris for approximately five years, he returned to America to establish a successful studio in Boston.

His first original wood engraving was created in 1879 under the tutelage of Robert Swain Gifford. His first original prints specialized in both architectural views and landscapes, with his later etchings mostly featuring areas around Boston.

Garrett provided the chief influence for Childe Hassam's first study trip to Europe in July 1883. On June 30, 1883, Garrett and Hassam sailed to Europe aboard the SS Anchoria, then travelled for several months throughout Great Britain, The Netherlands, France, Italy, Switzerland and Spain studying paintings from the old masters and creating watercolors of the European countryside. In late August 1883, both Garrett and Hassam sailed aboard the SS Alsatia to several Spanish ports before crossing the Atlantic back home.

After they both returned to Boston, Garrett resumed his illustration work for various publishers, which was very much in demand, keeping him from spending energy on his watercolors. During this time, Garrett worked at a studio located at 12 West Street in Boston, which he shared with Hassam and fellow-artist Charles Henry Turner.

In 1884, Garrett exhibited two watercolors at the Pennsylvania Academy ("A Street in Granada" and "El Mirador de la Reina, Alhambra") in 1884. He also exhibited "A Street in Granada" at the "Third Annual Exhibition of the Paint and Clay Club," which was held at the Gallery of the Boston Art Club in March 1884.

During the last two decades of the nineteenth century, Edmund Garrett's paintings and etchings were widely exhibited throughout the United States and in France at the Paris Salon.

During his lifetime, Garrett was a prolific illustrator of many books and publications, including various books of poetry by Tennyson, Keats, and Schiller; the Legends of King Arthur; Austen's Pride & Prejudice; Marie Louise de la Ramée's (Ouida's) A Dog of Flanders; stories by Alexandre Dumas; various books of Elizabethan and Victorian songs; and other books by Longfellow, Sir Walter Scott, Shelley, Wordsworth, and Hawthorne, among others.

Today, Garrett's works adorn the walls of the Art Institute of Chicago, Metropolitan Museum of Art in New York, and the New York Public Library, the Boston Public Library, and the Massachusetts State House. Other works appear in collections at the Public Library in Winchester, Mass; Calumet Club (Boston, Mass.), Brookside Library; Conant Memorial Church; and the Fine Arts Museum of San Francisco.

Garrett died in Needham, Massachusetts on April 2, 1929.

== Partial list of books illustrated/compiled by Edmund Garrett ==
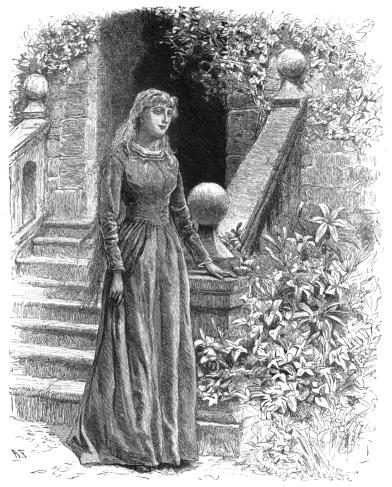
Book Illustration example of Edmund H. Garrett, from Tennyson's Lady Clare, 1884

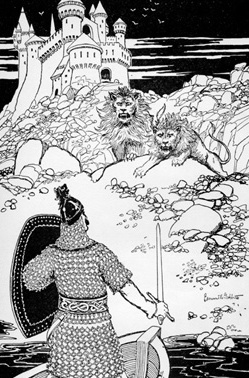
Book Illustration example of Edmund H. Garrett, from Legends of King Arthur & His Court, 1901

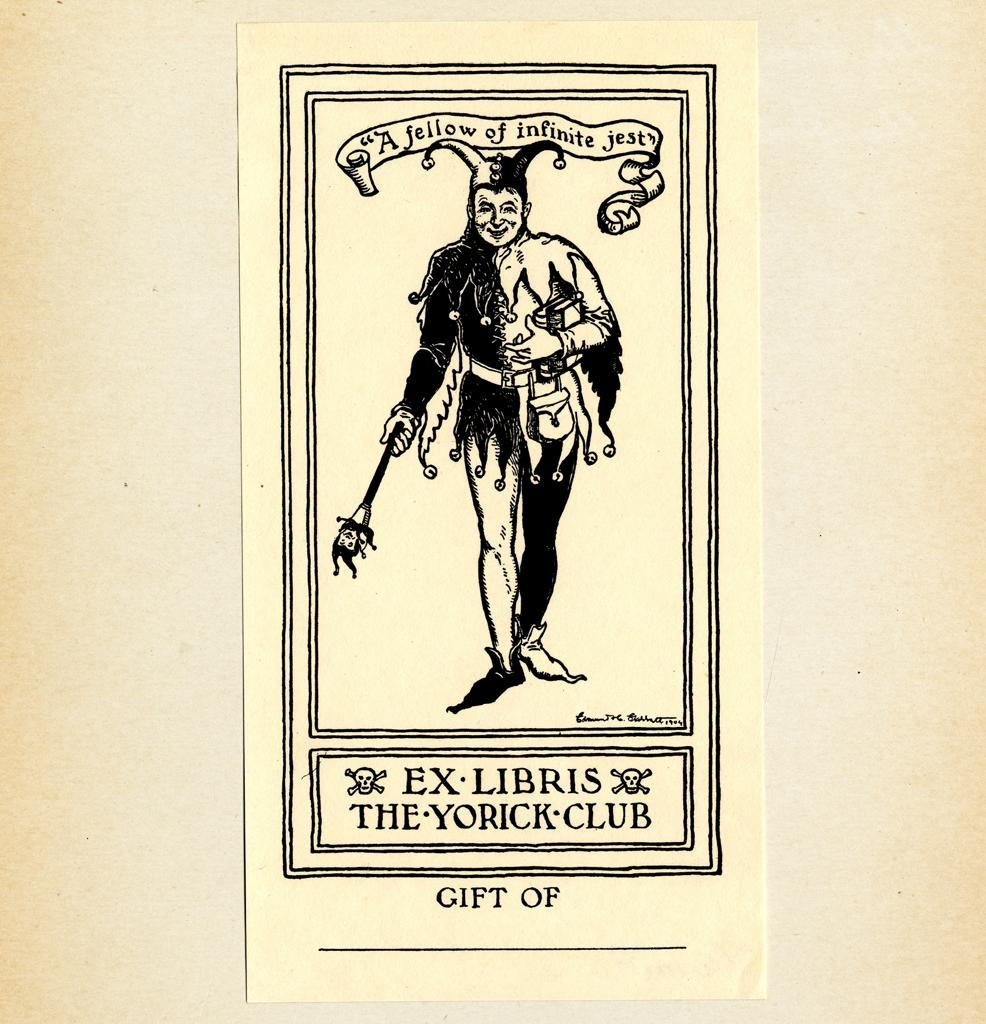
Bookplate by Edmund H. Garrett, depicting a Court Jester, for the Yorick Club

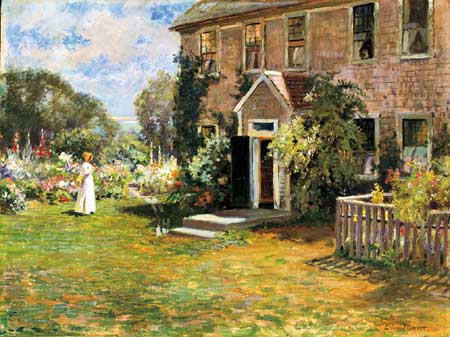
Example of Edmund Garrett's painting work

- The Village Blacksmith by Henry Wadsworth Longfellow, 1880
- Song of the Bell by Friedrich Schiller, 1882
- Come into the Garden, Maud by Alfred Tennyson, 1883
- Life on the Mississippi by Mark Twain, 1883
- Bingen on the Rhine by Caroline E.S. Norton, 1883
- Lady Clare by Alfred Tennyson, 1884
- Eve of St. Agnes by John Keats, 1885
- Favorite Poems and the High Tide on the Coast of Lincolnshire 1571 by Jean Ingelow, 1886
- Pilgrims of the Night collected and Illustrated by Edmund H. Garrett, 1887
- Ballads About Authors by Harriet Spofford, 1887
- The Closing Scene by Thomas Buchanan Read, 1887
- Christmas in the Olden Time by Sir Walter Scott, 1887
- Ballads of Romance & History by Susan Coolidge, et al., 1887
- Enoch Arden by Alfred Tennyson, 1888
- Fairy Lilian & Other Poems by Alfred Tennyson, 1888
- From Greenland's Icy Mountains by Bishop Heber, 1889
- Rab and His Friends by John Brown, 1890
- Annie & Willie's Prayer by Sophie P. Snow, 1890
- The Blind Musician by Vladimir Korolenko, 1890
- Jane Eyre: An Autobiography by Charlotte Brontë, 1890
- Elizabethan Songs in Honour of Love And Beautie, Compiled and Illustrated by Edmund Henry Garrett, 1891
- Roses of Romance from the Poems of John Keats, Selected and Illustrated by Edmund H. Garrett, 1891
- Flowers of Fancy by Percy Shelley, 1891
- Ailes d'Alouette by F.W. Bourdillon, 1891
- The Novels of Jame Austen (Volumes 1 through 6) by Jane Austen, 1892
- Bimbi, Stories for Children by Ouida (Maria Louise Ramé), 1892
- Poems by William Wordsworth, edited by Matthew Arnold, 1892
- Echoes from the Sabine Farm by Eugene & Rowell Martin Field, 1893
- Yanko the Musician & Other Stories by Henryk Sienkiewicz, 1893
- Three Heroines of New England Romance by Harriet P. Spofford, 1894
- Victorian Songs: Lyrics of the Affections and Nature, Edited and Illustrated by Edmund H. Garrett, 1895
- Carmen: A Memoir by Prosper Mérimée, 1896
- Camilla: A Novel by Richert Von Koch, 1896
- Romances and Reality of the Puritan Coast by Edmund H. Garrett, 1897
- Two Little Wooden Shoes: A Story by Ouida (Maria Louise Ramé), 1897
- Quo Vadis: A Narrative of the Time of Nero by Henryk Sienkiewicz, 1897
- Hypatia or New Foes with Old Faces by Charle Kingsley and Edmund H. Garrett, 1897
- The She-Wolves Of Machecoul; A Romance Of The Last Vendee; to which is added The Corsican Brothers; in two volumes. The Romances of Alexandre Dumas: volumes forty-four, and forty-five by Alexandre Dumas, 1897
- Twenty Years After; A Romance Of The Regency Of Anne Of Austria, in two volumes. The Romances of Alexandre Dumas: volumes eighteen, and nineteen by Alexandre Dumas, 1897
- The Gray House of the Quarries by Mary Harriott Norris, 1898
- The Nurnberg Stove by Ouida (Maria Louise Ramé), 1898
- An Account of Anne Bradstreet, The Puritan Poetess & Kindred Topics edited by Colonel Luther Caldwell, 1898
- Rubaiyat of Omar Khayyam by Khayyam Omar, 1898
- By the Fireside; A Book of Good Stories for Young People Illustrated by Edmund H. Garrett, 1898
- Backlog Studies by Charles Dudley Warner, 1899
- The Hunter Cats by Helen Jackson, 1899
- The Three Musketeers by Alexandre Dumas, 1899
- Notes of Travel by Nathaniel Hawthorne, 1900
- Legends of King Arthur and His Court by Frances Nimmo Greene, 1901
- The Pilgrim Shore of the Massachusetts Coast by Edmund H. Garrett, 1900
- Celebrated Crimes by Alexandre Dumas, 1902
- The Night Has a Thousand Eyes & Other Poems by F.W. Bourdillon, 1903
- Bookplates Selected from the Works of Edmund H. Garrett, and a Notice of Them by Wililam Howe Downes, 1904
- Vicomte de Bragelonne (Vol. III) by Alexandre Dumas, 1904
- Stories from Famous Ballads by Grace Greenwood (Sara Jane Lippincott) and edited by Caroline Burnite, 1906
- Snow-Bound: A Writers Idyl by John Greenleaf Whittier, 1906. (Reprinted in 2007)
- Venetian Life by William Dean Howells, 1907
- A Dog of Flanders & Other Stories by Ouida (Maria Louise Ramé), 1910
- Travelers Five Along Life's Highway: Jimmy, Gideon Wiggan, The Clown, Wexley Snathers, Bap. Sloan by Annie Fellows Johnson, 1911
- The Sword of Bussy, or the Word of a Gentleman by Robert Neilson Stephens and Herman Nickerson, 1912
- The Island of Beautiful Things: A Romance of the South by Will Allen Dromgoole, 1912
- John O'Partletts: A Tale of Strife and Courage by Jean Edgerton Hovey, 1913
- Moufflou and Other Stories by Ouida (Maria Louise Ramé), 1910
- A Flower of Monterey (A Romance of the Californias) by Katherine B. Hamill, 1921

== List of his March 1884 exhibited watercolors ==
- A Street in Granada
- Boats at Venice
- Study of a Chateau Gateway
- March in New England
- Early Spring, Milton Meadows
- Street in Denia, Spain
- Rock of Dumbarton
