= My Patrasche =

Japanese anime television series

- フランダースの犬 ~ぼくのパトラッシュ~
- Based on: A Dog of Flanders by Maria Louise Ramé
- Written by: Haruka Yamazaki (episodes 1, 4, 7-8, 11-12, 15, 18-19, 22, 26); Michiru Shimada (episode 3); Taeko Okina (episodes 2, 5-6, 9-10, 13-14, 16-17, 20-21, 23-35)
- Directed by: Kenji Kodama
- Opening theme: Kun ni Ae Takara by MANA
- Ending theme: Little Wing by MANA
- Composer: Haruhiko Maruya
- Country of origin: Japan
- Original language: Japanese
- No. of episodes: 26

Production
- Producers: Hibiki Ito (NTV); Yasumichi Osaki (TMS); Masahito Yoshioka
- Editor: Masatochi Tsurubuchi
- Running time: 24 minutes
- Production company: Tokyo Movie Shinsha

Original release
- Network: NTV
- Release: October 10, 1992 – March 27, 1993

My Patrasche (フランダースの犬 ~ぼくのパトラッシュ~, Furandāsu no Inu Boku no Patrasche) is a 1992 Japanese animated television series adaptation of Maria Louise Ramé's 1872 novel A Dog of Flanders, produced by Tokyo Movie Shinsha. 26 episodes were produced. The series debuted on Nippon Television on October 10, 1992, and was cancelled on March 27, 1993, due to low ratings, but the last two episodes were produced and debuted on home video instead.

== Episode List ==
1. Meeting Patrasche: Nello and his grandfather are introduced, who, despite being poor, do their best in selling milk from townhouse to townhouse and being with whatever they have. One day, while going to the town, they find a poor Flanders breed dog being mistreated by its brutish owner. Nello, out of sheer kindness, wants to stop it, but the owner just won't let it. So, Nello and his grandfather sadly proceed to work. Meanwhile, the poor dog has been beaten so much that he can hardly move, so the owner left him on the side of the road to go steal another one. While on the way back, when it is about to rain, Nello finds the barely alive dog on the roadside and takes him to be resuscitated in his home.

2. Luck of Patrasche: With the care of Jehas Dass and Nello and medication from Alois's father, Patrasche heals from his wound for 2&1/2 days. Nello decides to keep Patrasche and treats him well.

3. A gift from Grandpa: Grandpa does some woodcutting for the abusive Mr. Baumann, so he could get nello a book titiled, Grimm's fairy tales. But gets sick because of the strain. From then on, Patrasche decides to help them pull the milk-cart.

4. First Drawing: Nello finds his passion in drawing, but grandpa disapproves of it.

5. Why Grandpa?: Grandpa later explains that it was because of Nello's father, Nicolai's art passion is what drove his daughter, Anna, to him, and Nello's awakening of his potential is what reminded him of it.

6. Dad...Mom...: Grandpa later explains to Nello that it was because Nello's father, Nicolai's art passion is what drove his daughter, Anna, to him, and Nello's awakening of his potential is what reminded him of it. But later, he does accept Nello's passion and lets it flourish.

7. Stolen Patrasche: Patrasche gets stolen be the brute.

8. Give me back Patrasche!: Nello retrieves his pet dog.

9. Rubens painting: Nello goes to the central church and sees Rubens ' mother-god maria painting, but he can't see jesus's painting as that has a prize on it and Nello is a pauper.

10. Simon, the shepherd's boy: Nello befriends a boy named Simon, with a dream to be a sailor.

11. Aloa's birthday: Nello gives Aloa a flower for his birthday, which is expected by her mother, and he then has a grand time celebrating the party in her house.

12. Run, Patrasche!: Nello gets stuck in a forest crevice while getting firewood for his bedridden Grandpa. It then comes to Patrasche to get a search party to save him.

13. Degraded picture: After an unfortunate event, where Phillip's mother and his art teacher berate his picture so to not upstage Phillip, Simon comes back from his sea job and enlivens Nello's spirits by gifting him a charcoal paint tool.

14. Aunt Nuret is having a hard time: The abusive Mr. Baumann wants to kick out the gentle Aunt Nuret from her domicile, so he crafts a lie. But because of Nello's deterministic honesty, she is saved from that fate.

15. Goodbye, Dr. Renner: The motherly school teacher dr. Renner leaves a change in her job schedule.

16. Aloa selling milk: Nello is sick, making Aloa help him in selling milk.

17. The day I drew aloa: Aloa's strict father comes from work and develops a bad image of Nello because of Mr. baumann. Because of that, he forbids Aloa from seeing Nello again.

18. Aloa separated: Baas Cogez, Aloa's father repeatedly stops Aloa from seeing Nello.

19. Uninvited birthdays: Learning that Baas Cogez doesn't want him to attend Aloa's party, the ever-considerate Nello agrees not to attend her party to calm both sides, although that makes him sad to not give her the gift he would have worked hard for.

20. Windmill fire: There appears a fire lit up by the scheming Baumann character inadvertently, but although Nello was there giving Aloa the woodworked Patrasche, he would have no idea that he would get blamed for it.

21. Painfully Sad Rumours: Through the ever-incorrigible Mr. Baumann there appears a rumour that Nello was the one who lit that fire as Mr. Baumann needs to spread it so his name doesn't get tarnished. Even though, Aloa vouches for him Baas Cogez guy doesn't budge from his stuck-up nature.

22. New milk for sale: One by one, everyone stopped selling milk to Nello and come some after, his entire job gets replaced.

23. Drawing competition: Although some are still selling milk to him out of pity, with that Nello and Grandpa are somehow surviving. Through 3 young well-wishers, Nello and Aloa get a chance have a surprise fun-time, and then Phillip sends a messenger to get him drawing supplies to encourage him to take part in the drawing competition. He puts all his heart and soul into it and sends his picture to the submission point.

24. Thank you Grandpa: Before death, Nello and his grandpa have their last meal together and have a nice time laughing together. They were talking about visiting Nello's parents' grave after the cold season would be over.

25. Good bye...Grandpa: Nello has a wonderful dream right before the day he finds out that he had lost his grandpa. A few days later, he goes to find out about the result, terribly, he didn't get it. As the judge may have been biased. Returning home, he gets evicted out of his house and then his prized drawing gets trashed by Mr. Baumann. In the night, hungry and cold, he found some money collection of Baas Cogez, which then he returned to the family, where leaves Patrasche with a bleeding heart so the dog may not have to suffer as much as he.

26. Last Christmas Eve: After the evil Mr. Baumann let's his drunk talk slip that he was the one behind the fire, everything became clear. With Aunt Nuret & Phillip out of town Simon not yet back from sea voyage, no one was sheltering Nello and Patrasche. Back at the cathedral, Nello and Patrasche die in each other's arms, Nello, hungry and cold, fully content that he finally got to see the Christ picture after yearning to see for so much time.

== See also ==
- Dog of Flanders (1975 TV series), Nippon Animation's adaptation of Maria Louise Ramé's novel.
