= Reginald Bathurst Birch =

English-American artist and illustrator

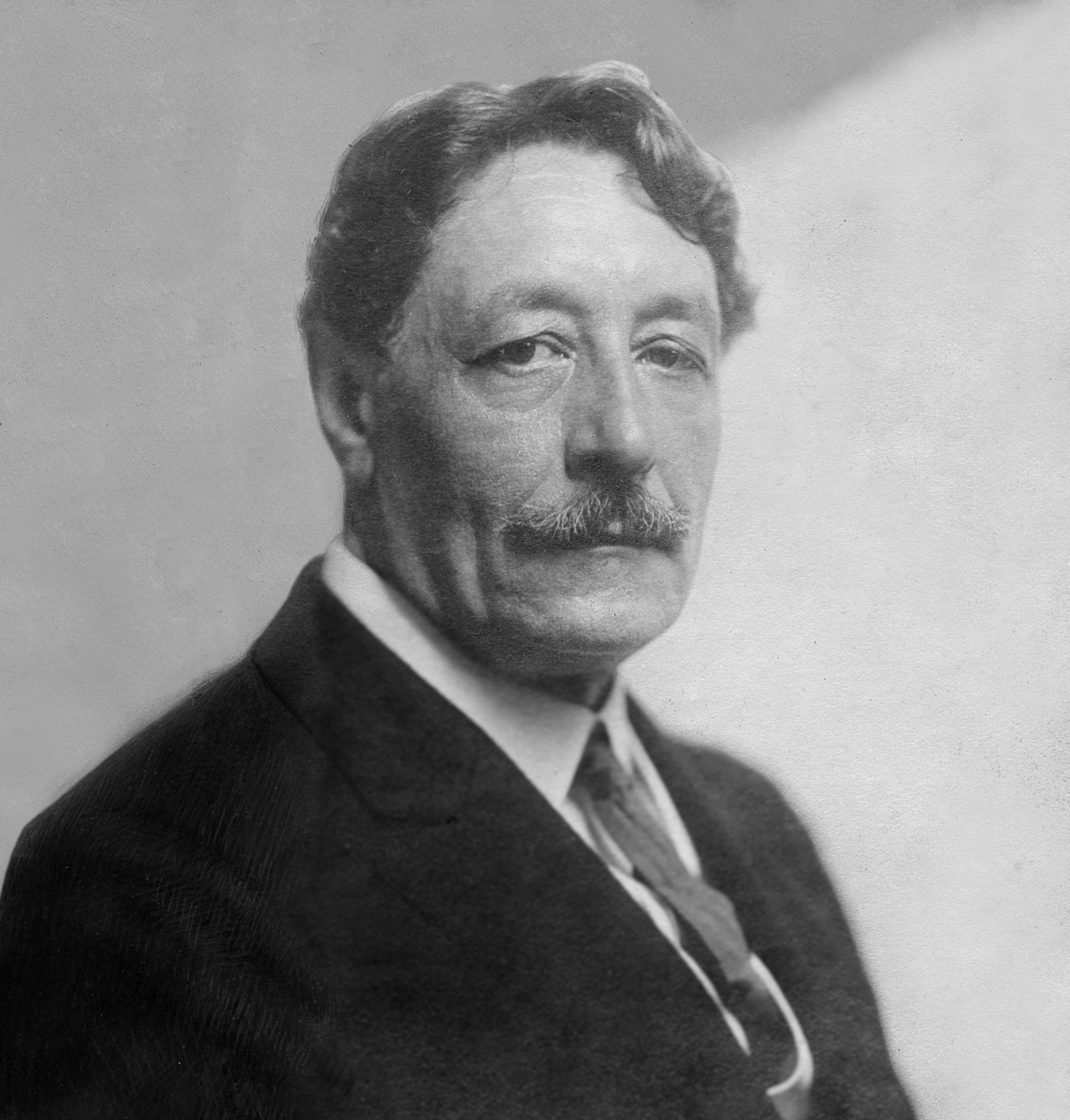
- Reginald Bathurst Birch.
- Born: Reginald Bathurst Birch; May 2, 1856; London, England
- Died: June 17, 1943 (aged 87); The Bronx, New York
- Education: Toby E. Rosenthal, Royal Academy, Munich
- Known for: Illustration

Reginald Bathurst Birch (May 2, 1856 – June 17, 1943) was an English-American artist and illustrator. He was best known for his depiction of the titular hero of Frances Hodgson Burnett's 1886 novel Little Lord Fauntleroy, which started a craze in juvenile fashion. While his illustrated corpus has eclipsed his other work, he was also an accomplished painter of portraits and landscapes.

== Life and family ==
Birch was born May 2, 1856, in London, England, the son of British army officer William Alexander Birch and Isabella (Hoggins) Birch. During his childhood he lived for a time with his paternal grandfather on the Isle of Jersey while his father was in India.

He moved to San Francisco, California, with his parents in 1870. Afterward he was naturalized as a citizen of the United States.

Birch married twice and had two children, a son and a daughter. The son, Rodney Bathurst Birch, was an early film actor.

Birch died at the age of eighty-seven of congestive heart failure at the Home for Incurables in the Bronx, New York. His body was interred at Woodlawn Cemetery in New York.

Birch's artistic talent first emerged in San Francisco, where he helped his father prepare wood-block theatrical posters. He soon attracted a patron in painter Toby Edward Rosenthal, who allowed him to use his studio and helped further his artistic education. From 1873 to 1881 Birch studied and worked in Europe, attending the Royal Academy of Fine Arts in Munich and illustrating various publications in Vienna, Paris, and Rome.

== Career ==
On his return to the United States, Birch took up residence in New York City, where he became a magazine illustrator. His work appeared in St. Nicholas, the Century, Harper's, Life, and The Youth's Companion, among other publications. He also became a founding member of the Society of Illustrators in New York.

His first great success was his illustration of Frances Hodgson Burnett's children's book Little Lord Fauntleroy (1886), whose young protagonist's long, curly hair and velvet and lace suit were widely imitated by mothers as a pattern of dress for their little boys. Birch's name was indelibly associated with Burnett's protagonist forever after, rather to the illustrator's irritation. During the period of his initial popularity he illustrated over forty books, many of which, along with his drawings, had initially seen publication in serial form. These included more of Burnett's children's books, notably Sara Crewe (1888).

Demand for Birch's work faded after 1914, and by the 1930s he was living in poverty. His career was revived in 1933 by his illustrations for Louis Untermeyer's The Last Pirate, and he went on to illustrate about twenty additional books before being retired by failing eyesight about 1941. Reginald Birch—His Book, a retrospective collection of works he illustrated by various authors, was published in 1939 by Harcourt, Brace and Company.

== Bibliography of books illustrated ==
- The story of Roland / by James Baldwin (1883)
- Historic boys : their endeavors, their achievements and their times / by Elbridge Streeter Brooks (1886)
- Little Lord Fauntleroy / by Frances Hodgson Burnett (1886)
- Chivalric days : stories of courtesy and courage in olden times / by Elbridge Streeter Brooks (1888)
- Sara Crewe; or, What happened at Miss Minchin's / by Frances Hodgson Burnett (1888)
- Another flock of girls / by Nora Perry (1890)
- In my nursery / by Laura Elizabeth Howe Richards (1890)
- Little Saint Elizabeth, and other stories / by Frances Hodgson Burnett (1890)
- Lady Jane / by Cecilia Viets Jamison (1891)
- Marjorie and her papa : how they wrote a story and made pictures for it / by Robert Howe Fletcher (1891)
- The Admiral's Caravan / by Charles E. Carryl (1892)
- Giovanni and the other; children who have made stories / by Frances Hodgson Burnett (1892)
- My odd little folk : rhymes and verses about them : with some others / by Malcolm Douglas (1893)
- The one I knew the best of all / by Frances Hodgson Burnett (1893)
- Imaginotions; Truthless Tales / by Tudor Jenks (1894)
- Piccino, and other child stories / by Frances Hodgson Burnett (1894)
- Child-sketches from George Eliot : glimpses at the boys and girls in the romances of the great novelist / by Julia Magruder (1895)
- Master Skylark / by John Bennett (1896)
- Field Flowers : a small bunch of the most fragrant of blossoms gathered from the broad acres of Eugene Field's farm of love / by Eugene Field (1896)
- Two little pilgrims' progress; a story of the city beautiful / by Frances Hodgson Burnett (1897)
- Down Durley lane and other ballads / by Virginia Woodward Cloud (1898)
- The sole survivors / by G A Henty (1899)
- The vizier of the two-horned Alexander / by Frank Richard Stockton (1899)
- The "Little Women" play; a two-act, forty-five-minute play, adapted from Louisa May Alcott's famous story / by Elizabeth Lincoln Gould (1900)
- Little men : life at Plumfield with Jo's boys : a sequel to "Little Women" / by Louisa M. Alcott (1901)
- The Wouldbegoods / by E Nesbit (1901)
- The circle / by Katherine Cecil Thurston (1903)
- Red Head / by John Uri Lloyd (1903)
- A little rough rider / by Tudor Jenks (1904)
- Outdoorland : stories for children / by Robert W. Chambers (1902)
- Orchard-Land / by Robert W. Chambers (1903)
- Tales from Dickens / by Hallie Erminie Rives (1905)
- The breaking in of a yachtsman's wife / by Mary Heaton Vorse (1908)
- Farming it / by Henry A. Shute (1909)
- Betty's happy year / by Carolyn Wells (1910)
- The Christmas angel / by Abbie Farwell Brown (1910)
- The siege of the seven suitors / by Meredith Nicholson (1910)
- Miss Santa Claus of the Pullman / by Annie Fellows Johnson (1913)
- Pippin / by Evelyn Van Buren (1913)
- The turning of Griggsby; being a story of keeping up with Dan'l Webster / by Irving Bacheller (1913)
- Diane of the Green Van / by Leona Dalrymple (1914)
- Bonnie May / by Louis Dodge (1916)
- Master Skylark : or, Will Shakespeare's ward; a dramatization from the story of the same name by John Bennett in five acts / by Edgar White Burrill (1916)
- Waitful watching, or, Uncle Sam and the fight in Dame Europa's school / by James L. Ford (1916)
- The youth Plupy, or, The lad with a downy chin / by Henry A. Shute (1917)
- The Old Tobacco Shop: A True Account of What Befell a Little Boy in Search of Adventure / by William Bowen (1922)
- Will Shakespeare's little lad / by Imogen Clark (1925)
- The last pirate; tales from the Gilbert and Sullivan operas / by Louis Untermeyer (1934)
- Soldier Rigdale : how he sailed in the "May-flower" and how he served Miles Standish / by Beulah Marie Dix (1934)
- Rainbow in the sky / collected and edited by Louis Untermeyer (1935)
- The bad parents' garden of verse / by Ogden Nash (1936)
- The reformed pirate; stories from The floating prince, Ting-a-ling tales & The queen's museum / by Frank R. Stockton (1936)
- Harry in England : being the partly-true adventures of H.R. in the year 1857 / by Laura E. Richards (1937)
- Moonshine in Candle Street / by Constance Savery (1937)
- The Night Before Christmas / by Clement Clarke Moore (1937)
- I have a song to sing you, still more rhymes / by Laura Elizabeth Howe Richards (1938)
- A Little Princess / by Frances Hodgson Burnett (1938, new edition with new b/w illustrations and colour frontispiece, published by Scribner's)
- The Miniature's Secret / by Hildegarde Hawthorne (1938)
- Five Christmas Novels / by Charles Dickens (1939)
- The mystery of the silver chain / by Gladys Blake (1939)
- Reginald Birch—his book; a selection of stories and poems with reproductions of the original illustrations made from 1886 to 1938 by Reginald Birch / edited by Elisabeth B. Hamilton (1939)
- Terrence O'Hara / by Thomas Burns (1939)
