= Alice (Alice's Adventures in Wonderland) =

Character from children's novel

- Alice character
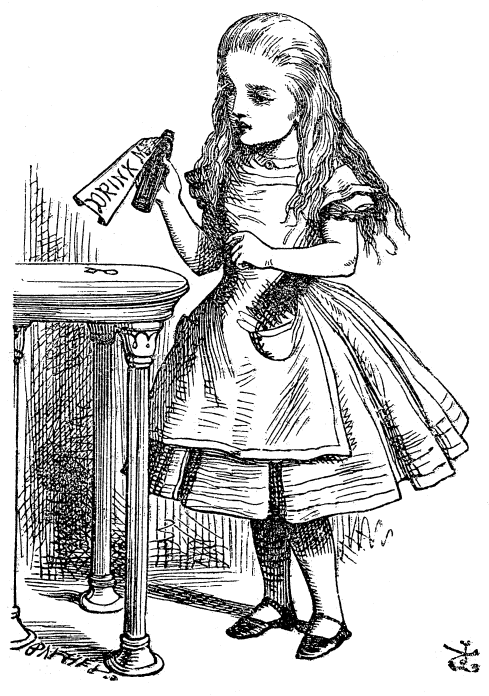
- Alice in one of John Tenniel's illustrations for Alice's Adventures in Wonderland
- First appearance: Alice's Adventures in Wonderland (1865)
- Last appearance: Alice Through the Looking-Glass (2016)
- Created by: Lewis Carroll

Alice is a fictional character and the titular protagonist of Lewis Carroll's children's novel Alice's Adventures in Wonderland (1865) and its sequel, Through the Looking-Glass (1871). A child in the mid-Victorian era, Alice unintentionally goes on an underground adventure after falling down a rabbit hole into Wonderland; in the sequel, she steps through a mirror into an alternative world.

The character originated in stories told by Carroll to entertain the Liddell sisters while rowing on the Isis with his friend Robinson Duckworth, and on subsequent rowing trips. Although she shares her given name with Alice Liddell, scholars disagree about the extent to which she was based upon Liddell. Characterized by Carroll as "loving and gentle", "courteous to all", "trustful", and "wildly curious", Alice has been variously seen as clever, well-mannered, and sceptical of authority, although some commentators find more negative aspects of her personality. Her appearance changed from Alice's Adventures Under Ground, the first draft of Alice's Adventures in Wonderland, to political cartoonist John Tenniel's illustrations of her in the two Alice books.

Alice has been identified as a cultural icon. She has been described as a departure from the usual nineteenth-century child protagonist, and the success of the two Alice books inspired numerous sequels, parodies, and imitations, with protagonists similar to Alice in temperament. She has been interpreted through various critical approaches, and has appeared and been re-imagined in numerous adaptations, including Walt Disney's film (1951). Her continuing appeal has been ascribed to her ability to be continuously re-imagined.

== Character ==
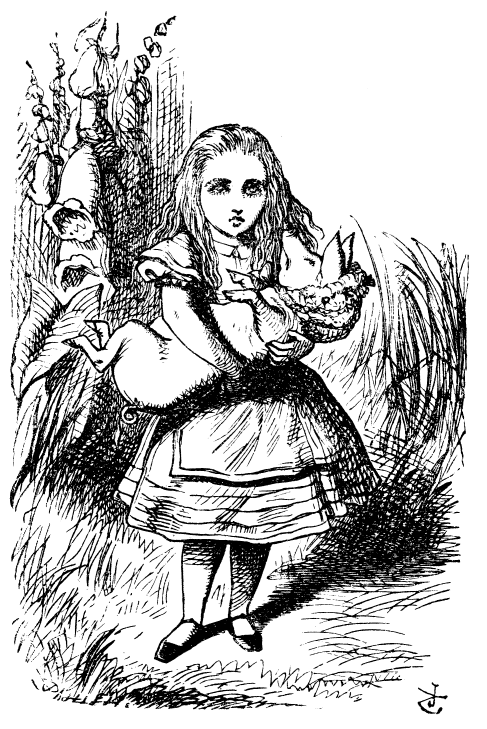
John Tenniel's illustration of Alice and the pig from Alice's Adventures in Wonderland (1865)

Alice is a fictional child living during the middle of the Victorian era. In Alice's Adventures in Wonderland (1865), which takes place on 4 May, (Note: 4 May was the birthday of Alice Liddell, the child friend of the author.) the character is widely assumed to be seven years old; Alice gives her age as seven and a half in the sequel, which takes place on 4 November. In the text of the two Alice books, author Lewis Carroll often did not remark on the physical appearance of his protagonist. Details of her fictional life can be discovered from the text of the two books. At home, she has a significantly older sister, a brother, a pet cat named Dinah, an elderly nurse, and a governess, who teaches her lessons starting at nine in the morning. Additionally, she had gone to a day school at some point in her backstory. Alice has been variously characterised as belonging to the upper class, middle class, or part of the bourgeoisie.

When writing on her personality in "Alice on the Stage" (April 1887), Carroll described her as "loving and gentle", "courteous to all", "trustful", and "wildly curious, and with the eager enjoyment of Life that comes only in the happy hours of childhood, when all is new and fair, and when Sin and Sorrow are but names – empty words signifying nothing!" Commentators characterise her as "innocent", "imaginative", introspective, generally well-mannered, critical of authority figures, and clever. Others see less positive traits in Alice, writing that she frequently shows unkindness in her conversations with the animals in Wonderland, takes violent action against the character Bill the Lizard by kicking him into the air, and reflects her social upbringing in her lack of sensitivity and impolite replies. According to Donald Rackin, "In spite of her class- and time-bound prejudices, her frightened fretting and childish, abject tears, her priggishness and self-assured ignorance, her sometimes blatant hypocrisy, her general powerlessness and confusion, and her rather cowardly readiness to abandon her struggles at the ends of the two adventures—[....] many readers still look up to Alice as a mythic embodiment of control, perseverance, bravery, and mature good sense."

The degree to which the character of Alice can be identified as Alice Liddell is controversial. Some critics identify the character as Liddell, or write that she inspired the character. Others argue that Carroll considered his protagonist and Liddell to be separate. According to Carroll, his character was not based on any real child, but was entirely fictional.

== Development ==
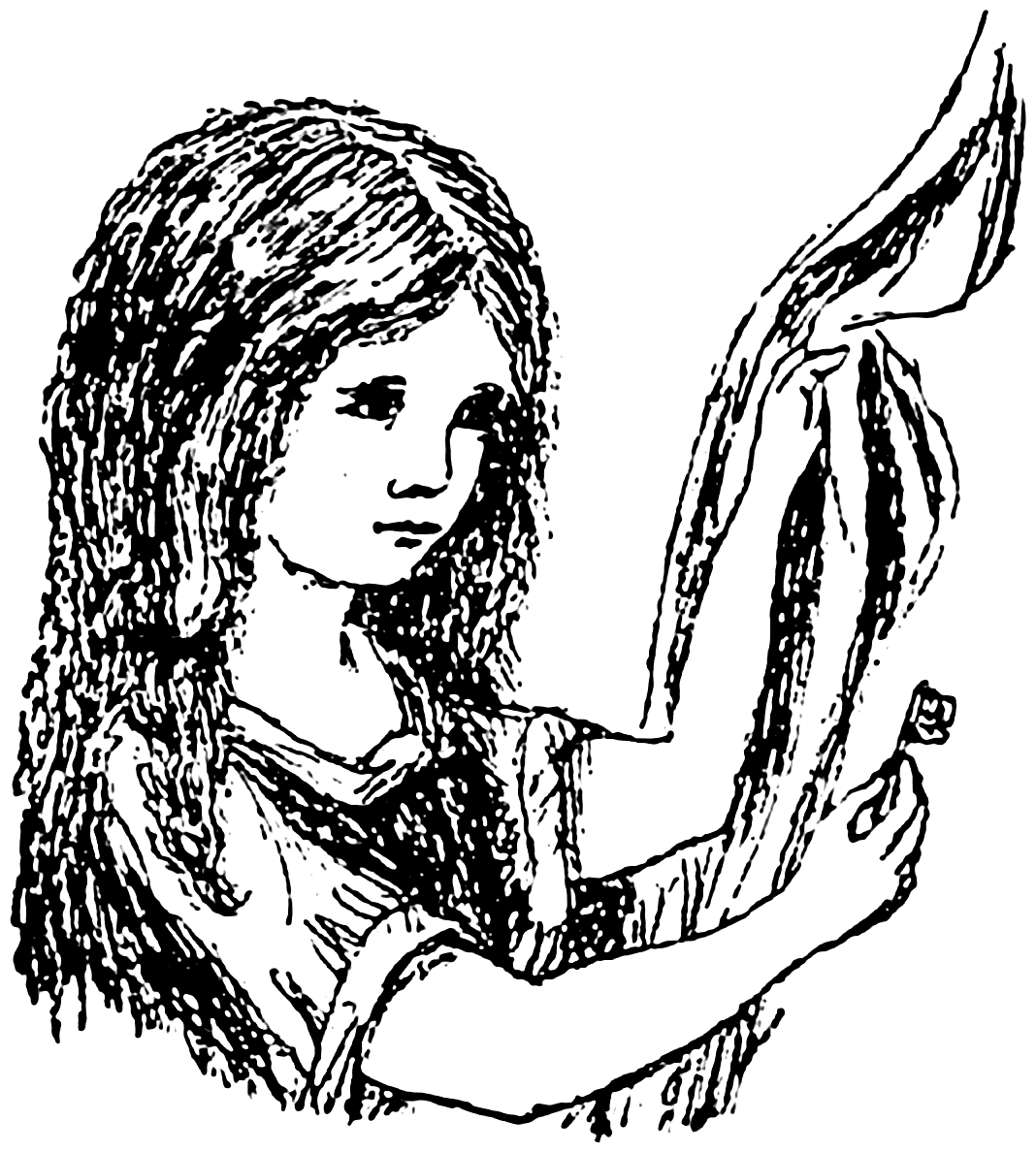
One of Carroll's drawings of Alice from Alice's Adventures Under Ground

Alice debuted in Carroll's first draft of Alice's Adventures in Wonderland, Alice's Adventures Under Ground. Under Ground originated from stories told to the Liddell sisters during an afternoon on 4 July 1862 while rowing on the Isis with his friend Robinson Duckworth, and on subsequent rowing trips. At the request of ten-year-old Alice Liddell, Carroll wrote down the stories as Alice's Adventures Under Ground, which he completed in February 1864. Under Ground contains thirty-seven illustrations, twenty-seven of which Alice is depicted in. As his drawings of Alice bear little physical resemblance to Alice Liddell, whose given name she shares, it has been suggested that Alice's younger sister, Edith, might have been his model.

Carroll portrays his protagonist as wearing a tunic, in contrast to the tailored dresses that the Liddell sisters might have worn. His illustrations drew influence from the Pre-Raphaelite painters Dante Gabriel Rossetti and Arthur Hughes, whose painting The Lady with the Lilacs (1863) he visually alluded to in one drawing in Under Ground. He gave the hand-written Alice's Adventures Under Ground to Alice Liddell in November 1864.

John Tenniel illustrated Alice's Adventures in Wonderland (1865) for a fee of £138, which was roughly a fourth of what Carroll earned each year and which he paid for himself. Tenniel was an already successful, well-known lead illustrator for the satirical magazine Punch, when Carroll employed him as an illustrator in April 1864. In contrast, Carroll did not have any literary fame at the time. Tenniel likely based the majority of his illustrations on those in Under Ground, and Carroll carefully oversaw his work; among his suggestions was that Alice should have long, light-coloured hair. Alice's clothes are typical of what a girl belonging to the middle class in the mid-Victorian era might have worn at home. Her pinafore, a detail created by Tenniel and now associated with the character, "suggests a certain readiness for action and lack of ceremony". Tenniel's depiction of Alice has its origins in a physically similar character which appeared in at least eight cartoons in Punch, during a four-year period that began in 1860. In an 1860 cartoon, this character wore clothes now associated with Alice: "the full skirt, pale stockings, flat shoes, and a hairband over her loose hair". In the cartoons, the character appeared as an archetype of a pleasant girl from the middle classes; she has been described as similar to Alice: "a pacifist and noninterventionist, patient and polite, slow to return the aggression of others".

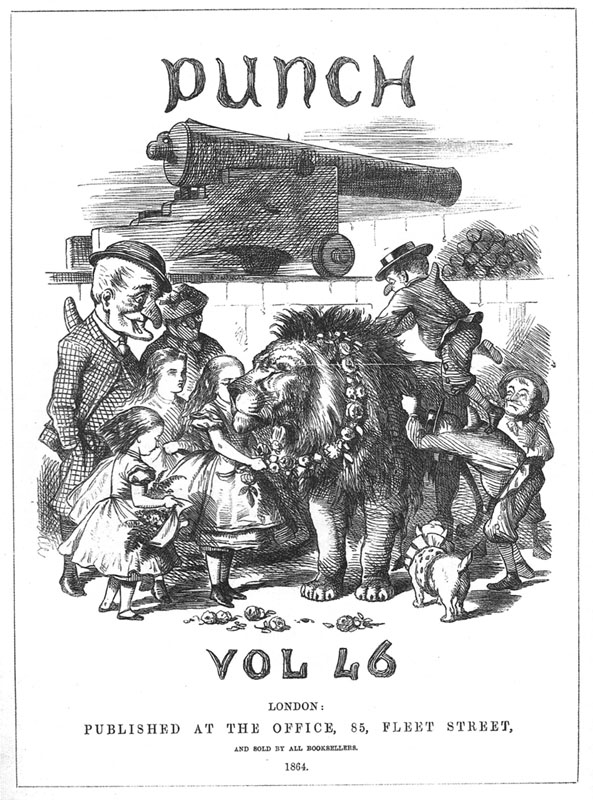
An early depiction of Alice on a Punch magazine cover (left of the lion).

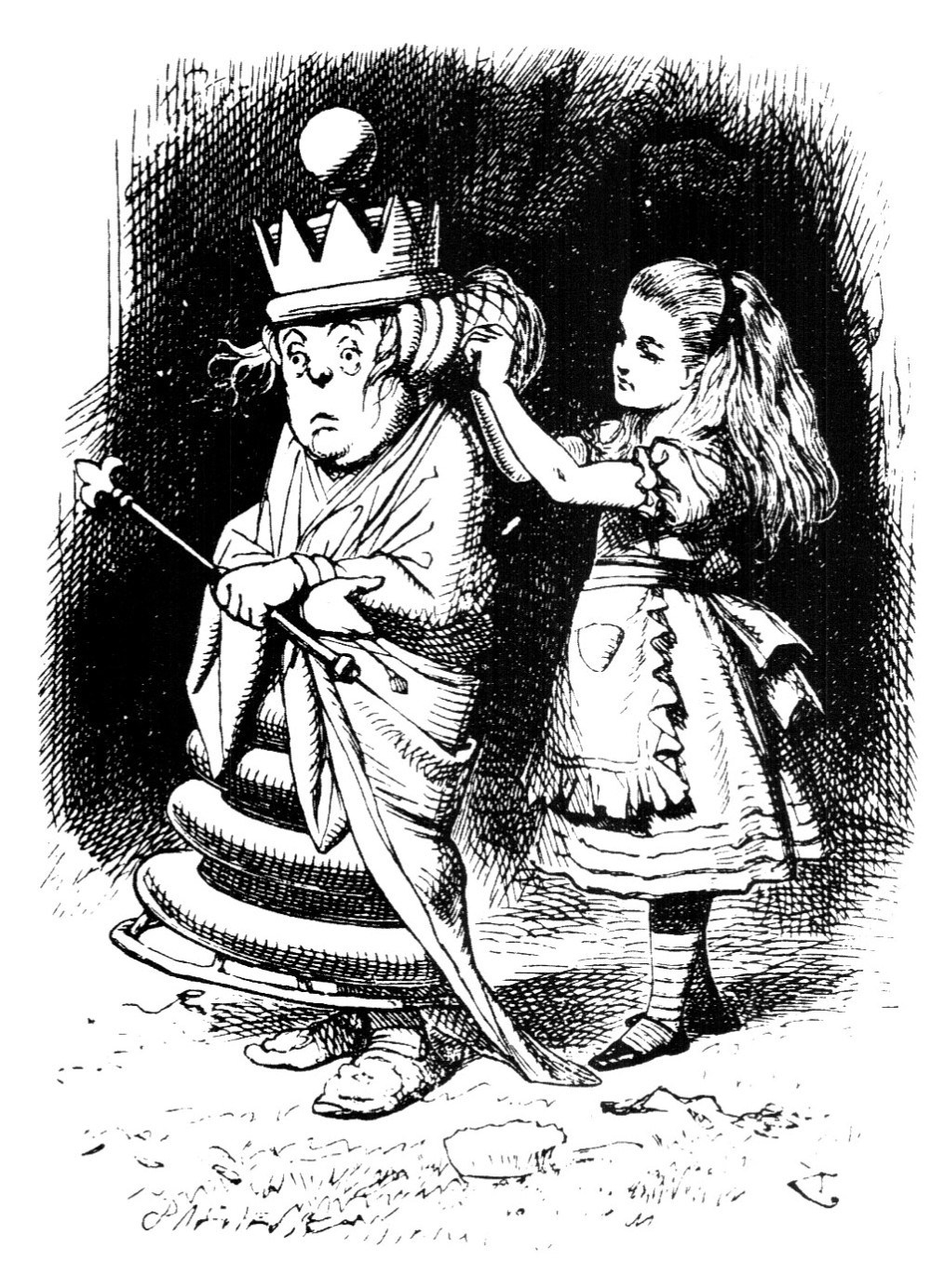
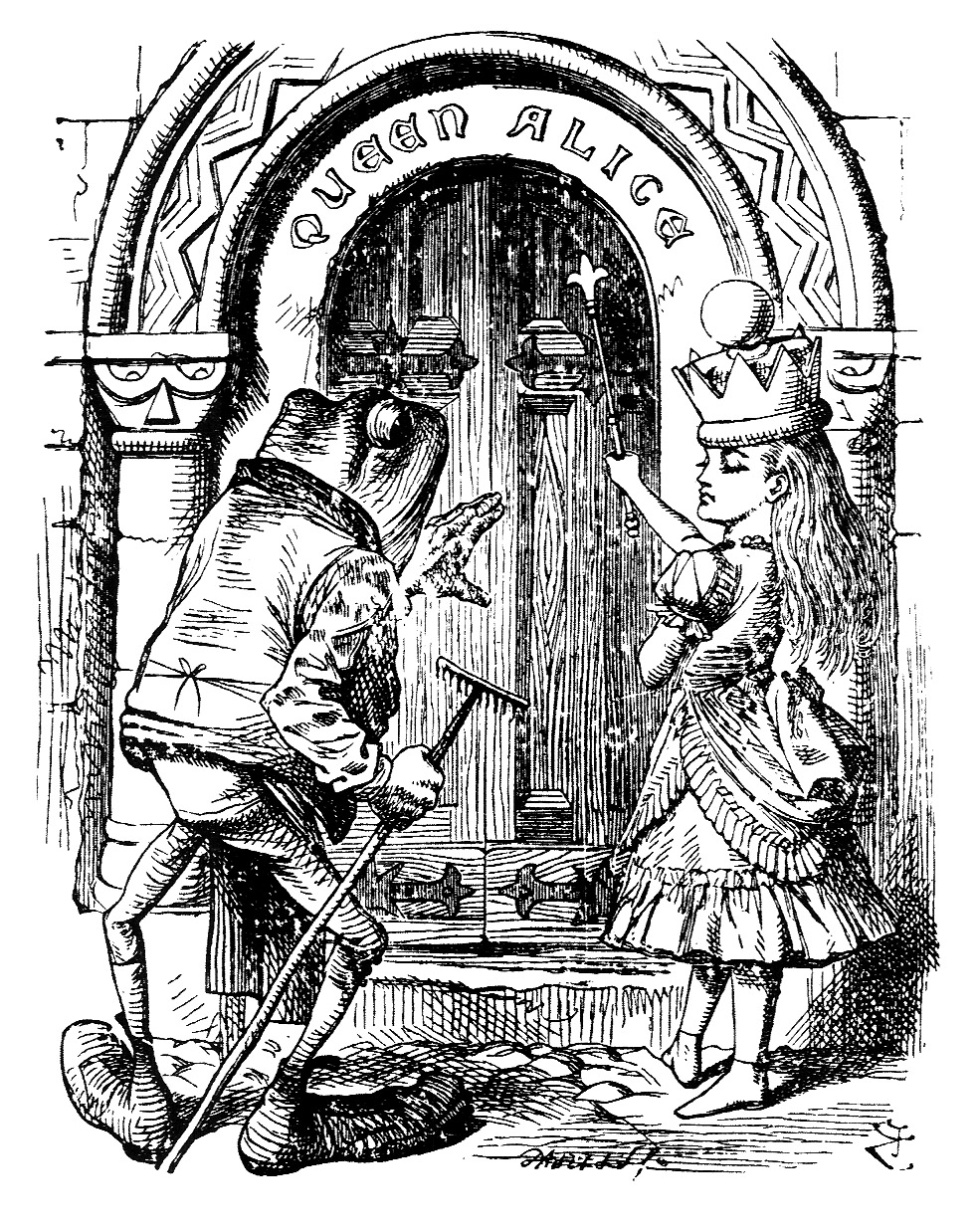
Tenniel's illustrations for Through the Looking-Glass (1871): Alice and the White Queen (left) and Queen Alice and the Frog (right)

Tenniel's fee for illustrating the sequel Through the Looking-Glass (1871) rose to £290, which Carroll again paid for out of his own pocket. Tenniel changed Alice's clothing slightly in the sequel, where she wears horizontal-striped stockings instead of plain ones and has a more ornate pinafore with a bow. Originally, Alice wore a "crinoline-supported chessmanlike skirt" similar to that of the Red and White Queens, as a queen; the design was rejected by Carroll. Her clothing as a queen and in the railway carriage is a polonaise-styled dress with a bustle, which would have been fashionable at the time. The clothing worn by the characters in My First Sermon (1863) by pre-Raphaelite painter John Millais and "The Travelling Companions" (1862) by Victorian painter Augustus Leopold Egg have some elements in common with Alice's clothing in the railway carriage. Carroll expressed unhappiness at Tenniel's refusal to use a model for illustrations of Alice, (Note: The evidence is lacking for the hypothesis that either Mary Hilton Badcock or Kate Lemon served as the visual model for Tenniel's Alice.) writing that this resulted in her head and feet being out of proportion.

In February 1881, Carroll contacted his publisher about the possibility of creating The Nursery "Alice", a simplified edition of Alice's Adventures in Wonderland with coloured and enlarged illustrations. Tenniel coloured twenty illustrations from Alice's Adventures in Wonderland, in addition to revising some aspects of them; Alice is depicted as a blonde, and her dress is yellow, with blue stockings. Her dress became pleated with a bow at the back of it, and she wore a bow in her hair. Edmund Evans printed the illustrations in colour through chromoxylography, a process using woodblocks to produce colour prints.

== Cultural impact ==
Alice has been recognised as a cultural icon. The Alice books have continued to remain in print, and the first book is available in a hundred languages. Alice's Adventures in Wonderland has continued to maintain its popularity, placing on surveys of the top children's books. Alice placed on a 2015 British survey of the top twenty favorite characters in children's literature. She also lends her name to the style of headband that she is depicted with in Tenniel's illustrations. The continued popularity of the two Alice books has resulted in numerous adaptations, re-imaginings, literary continuations, and various merchandise. The influence of the two Alice books in the literary field began as early as the mid-Victorian era, with various novels that adopted the style, acted as parodies of contemporary political issues, or reworked an element of the Alice books; (Note: Notable examples include Mopsa the Fairy (1869) by Jean Ingelow, Davy and the Goblin (1885) by Charles E. Carryl, The Westminster Alice (1900–02) by Saki, and Clara in Blunderland (1902) by Caroline Lewis.) they featured one or more protagonists with characteristics similar to Alice's ("typically polite, articulate, and assertive"), regardless of gender.

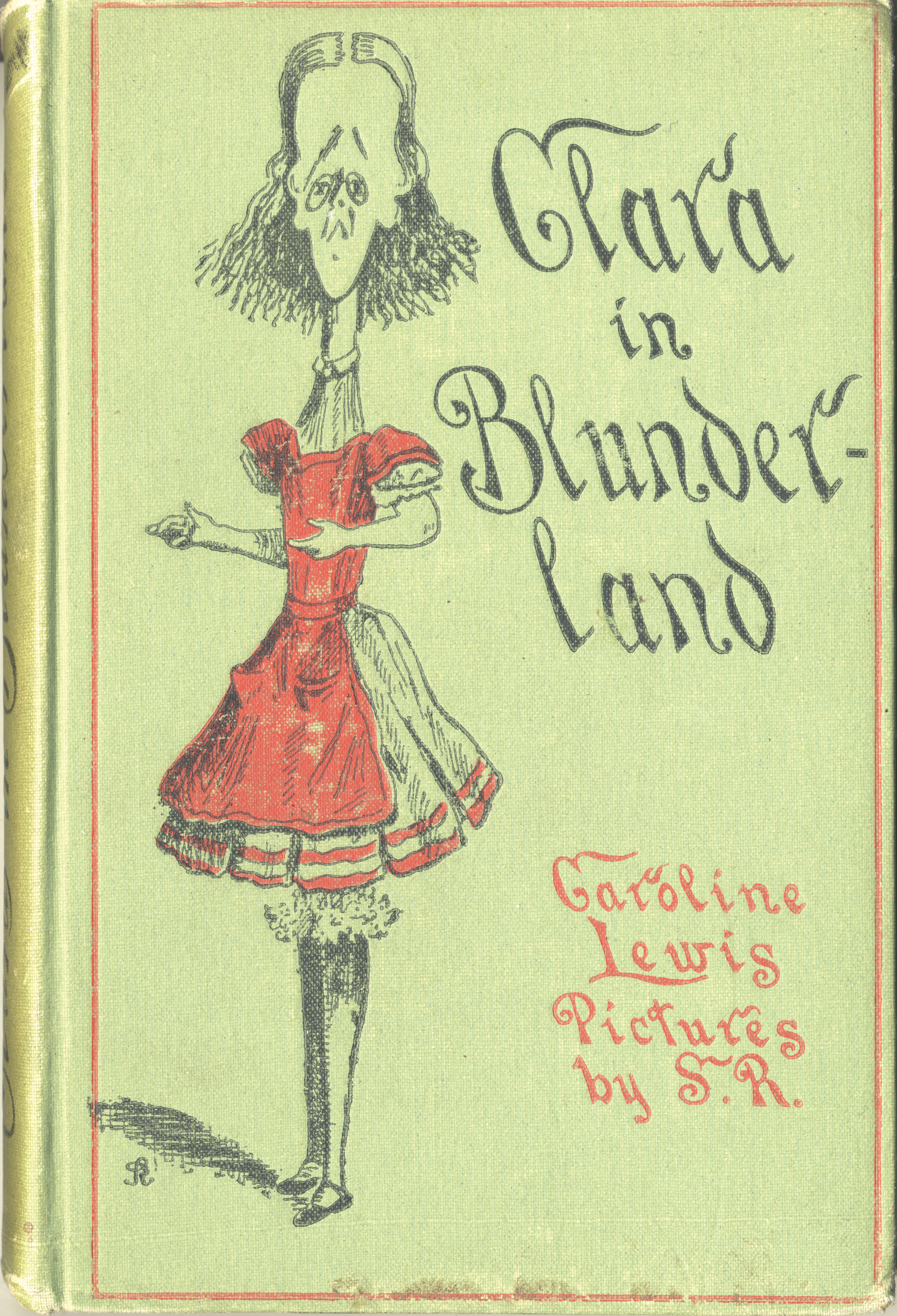
The cover of Clara in Blunderland (1902), a political parody of Alice in Wonderland

Alice's Adventures in Wonderland and Through the Looking-Glass were critically and commercially successful in Carroll's lifetime; more than 150,000 copies of Alice's Adventures in Wonderland and 100,000 copies of Through the Looking-Glass had been printed by 1898. Victorian readers generally enjoyed the Alice books as light-hearted entertainment that omitted the stiff morals which other books for children frequently included. In its review of the first Alice book, The Spectator described Alice as "a charming little girl, [...] with a delicious style of conversation," while The Publisher's Circular lauded her as "a simple, loving child." Several reviewers thought that Tenniel's illustrations added to the book, with The Literary Churchman remarking that Tenniel's art of Alice provided "a charming relief to the all the grotesque appearances which surround her." Alice's character has been highlighted by later literary critics as unusual or a departure from the typical mid-nineteenth-century child protagonists. Richard Kelly sees the character as Carroll's creation of a different protagonist through his reworking of the Victorian orphan trope. According to Kelly, Alice must rely on herself in Wonderland away from her family, but the moral and societal narrative arc of the orphan is replaced with Alice's intellectual struggle to maintain her sense of identity against the inhabitants of Wonderland. Alison Lurie argues that Alice defies the gendered, mid-Victorian conceptions of the idealized girl: Alice does not have a temperament in keeping with the ideal, and she challenges the adult figures in Wonderland.

From the 1930s to 1940s, the books came under the scrutiny of psychoanalytic literary critics. Freudians believed that the events in Alice's Adventures in Wonderland reflected the personality and desires of the author, because the stories which it was based on had been told spontaneously. In 1933, Anthony Goldschmidt introduced "the modern idea of Carroll as a repressed sexual deviant", theorizing that Alice served as Carroll's representation in the novel; Goldschmidt's influential work, however, may have been meant as a hoax. Regardless, Freudian analysis found in the books symbols of "classic Freudian tropes": "a vaginal rabbit hole and a phallic Alice, an amniotic pool of tears, hysterical mother figures and impotent father figures, threats of decapitation [castration], swift identity changes".

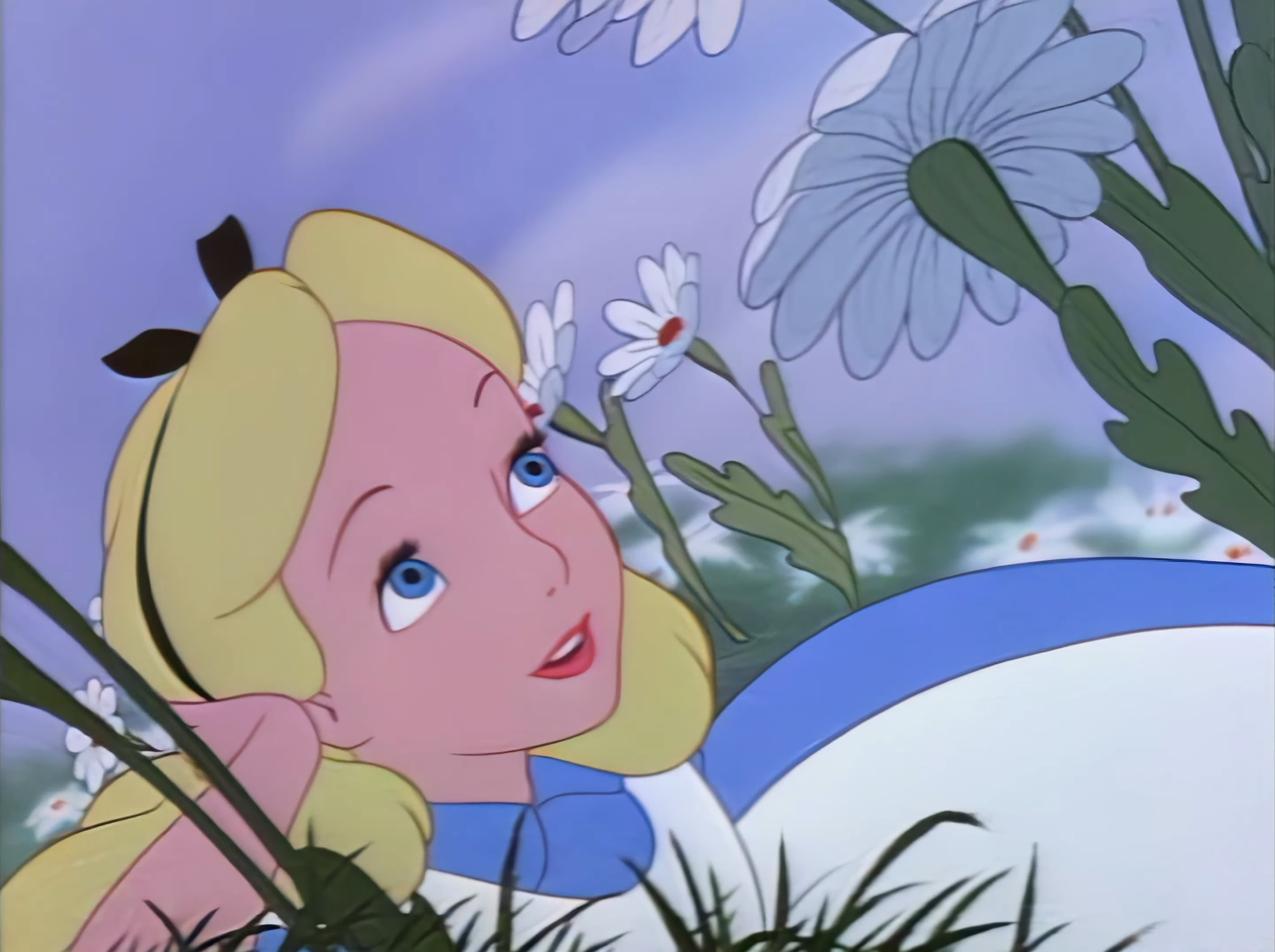
Alice, as she appears in Walt Disney's film adaptation (1951)

Described as "the single greatest rival of Tenniel," Walt Disney created an influential representation of Alice in his 1951 film adaptation, which helped to mould the image of Alice within pop culture. Although Alice had previously been depicted as a blonde in a blue dress in an unauthorised American edition of the two Alice books published by Thomas Crowell (1893), possibly for the first time, Disney's portrayal has been the most influential in solidifying the popular image of Alice as such. Disney's version of Alice has its visual basis in Mary Blair's concept drawings and Tenniel's illustrations. While the film was not successful during its original run, it later became popular with college students, who interpreted the film as a drug-drenched narrative. In 1974, Alice in Wonderland was re-released in the United States, with advertisements playing off this association. The drug association persists as an "unofficial" interpretation, despite the film's status as family-friendly entertainment.

In the twenty-first century, Alice's continuing appeal has been attributed to her ability to be continuously re-imagined. In Men in Wonderland, Catherine Robson writes that, "In all her different and associated forms—underground and through the looking glass, textual and visual, drawn and photographed, as Carroll's brunette or Tenniel's blonde or Disney's prim miss, as the real Alice Liddell [...] Alice is the ultimate cultural icon, available for any and every form of manipulation, and as ubiquitous today as in the era of her first appearance." Robert Douglass-Fairhurst compares Alice's cultural status to "something more like a modern myth," suggesting her ability to act as an empty canvas for "abstract hopes and fears" allows for further "meanings" to be ascribed to the character. Zoe Jaques and Eugene Giddens suggest that the character occupies a status within pop culture where "Alice in a blue dress is as ubiquitous as Hamlet holding a skull," which creates "the strange position whereby the public 'knows' Alice without having read either Wonderland or Looking-Glass." They argue that this allows for creative freedom in subsequent adaptations, in that faithfulness to the texts can be overlooked.

In Japan, Alice has a significant influence on pop culture. Tenniel's artwork and Disney's film adaptation have been credited as factors in the continuing favorable reception of the two novels. Within youth culture in Japan, she has been adopted as "a rebellion figure in much the same way as the American and British 1960s 'hippies' did." She has also been a source of inspiration for Japanese fashion, in particular Lolita fashion. Her popularity has been attributed to the idea that she performs the shōjo ideal, a Japanese understanding of girlhood that is "sweet and innocent on the outside, and considerably autonomous on the inside."

=== Other illustrators ===
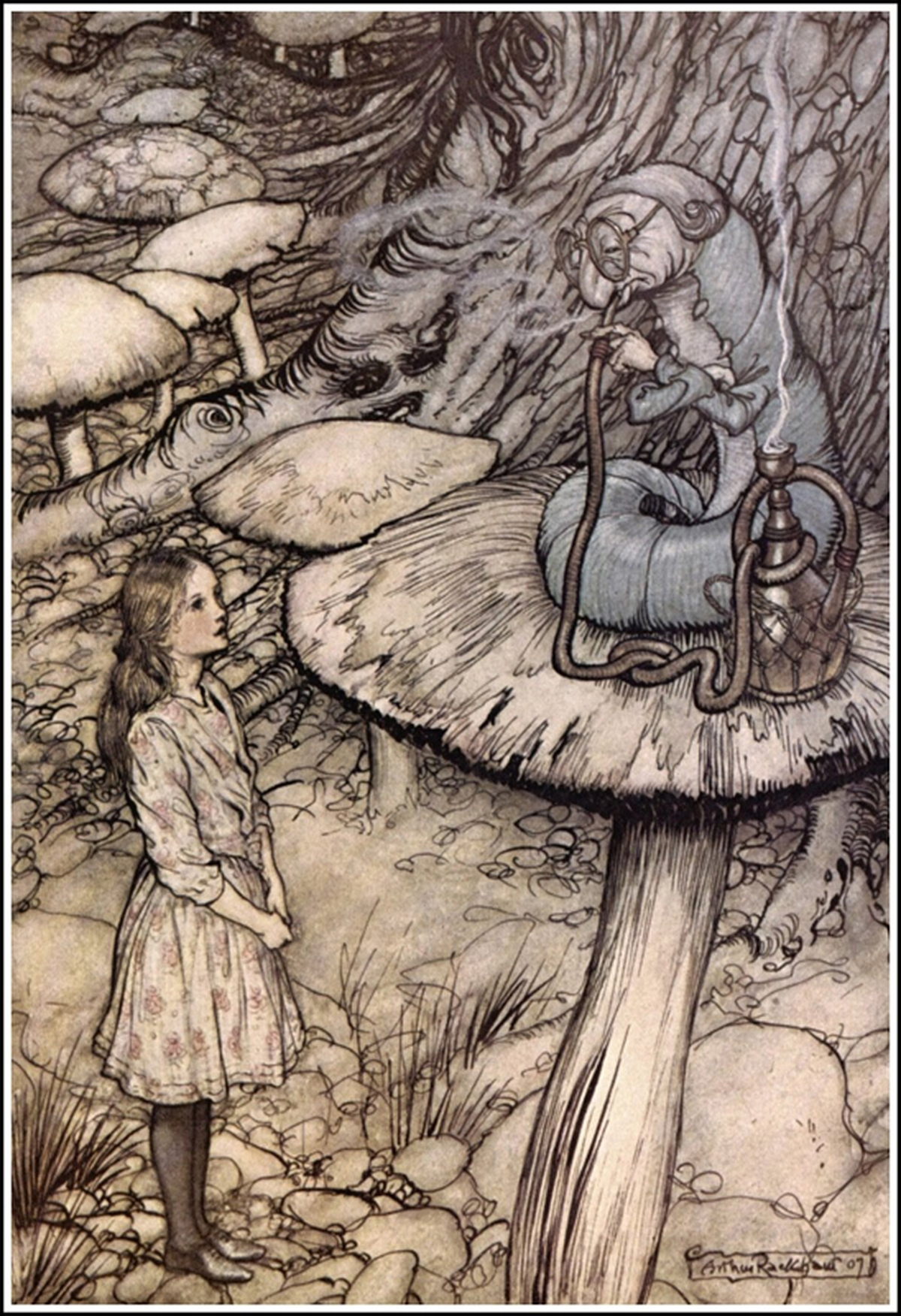
One of Rackham's art-nouveau illustrations, in which Alice encounters the Caterpillar (1907)

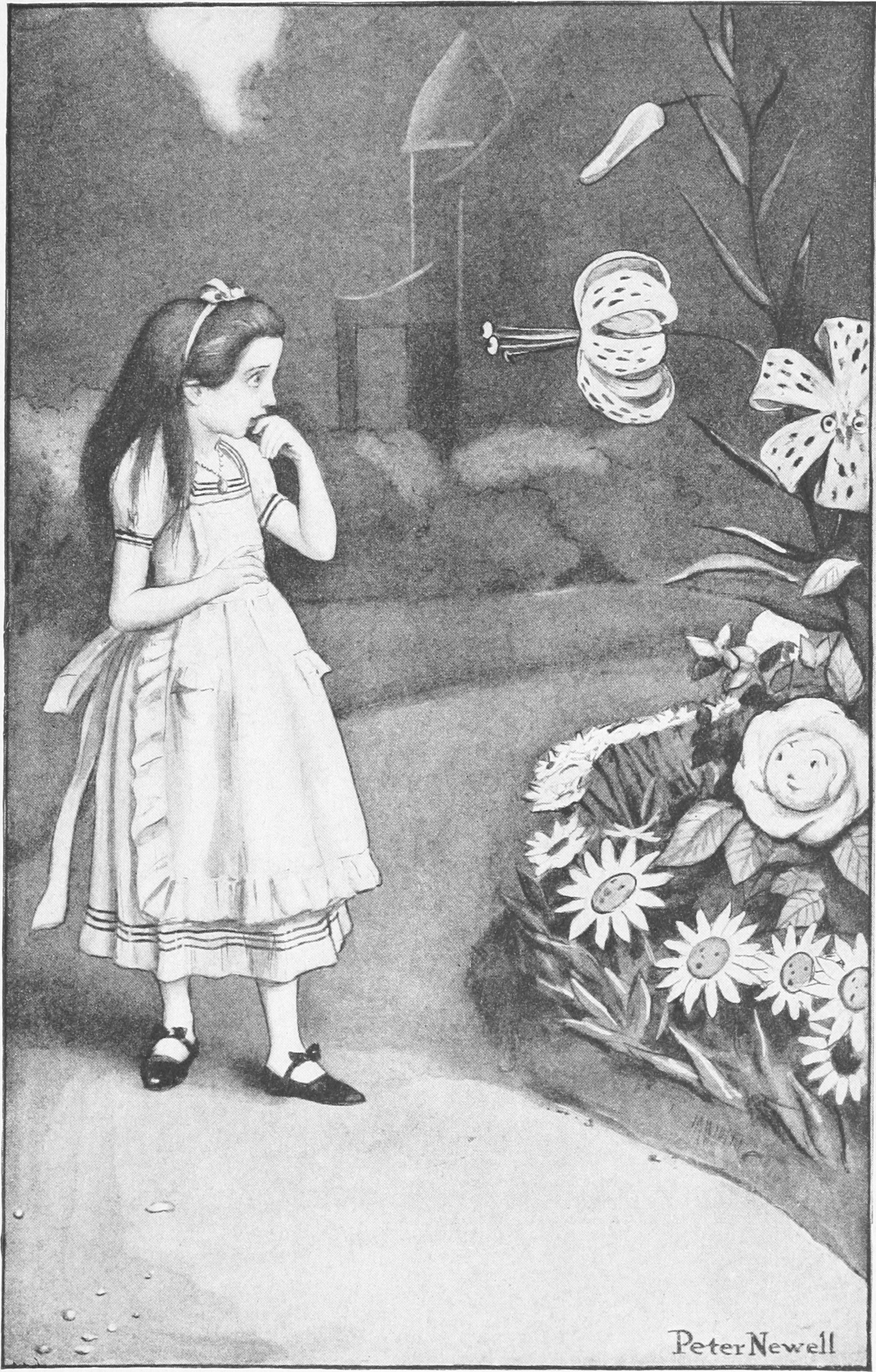
Newell's monochrome illustration of Alice among the Looking-Glass flowers (1901)

The two Alice books are frequently re-illustrated. The expiration of the copyright of Alice's Adventures in Wonderland in 1907 (Note: Through the Looking-Glass entered the public domain in 1948, after the 1911 Act, which extended the time before a book could enter the public domain from seven years following the death of the author to fifty.) resulted in eight new printings, including one illustrated in an Art Nouveau style by Arthur Rackham. The illustrators for the other editions published in 1907 include Charles Robinson, Alice Ross, W. H. Walker, Thomas Maybank and Millicent Sowerby. Among the other notable illustrators are Blanche McManus (1896); Peter Newell (1901), who used monochrome; Mabel Lucie Atwell (1910); Harry Furniss (1926); and Willy Pogany (1929), who featured an Art Deco style.

Notable illustrators from the 1930s onwards include Edgar Thurstan (1931), and his visual allusions to the Wall Street crash of 1929; D.R. Sexton (1933) and J. Morton Sale (1933), both of whom featured an older Alice; Mervyn Peake (1954); Ralph Steadman (1967), for which he received the Francis Williams Memorial award in 1972; Salvador Dalí (1969), who used Surrealism; and Peter Blake, with his watercolours (1970). By 1972, there were ninety illustrators of Alice's Adventures in Wonderland and twenty-one of Through the Looking-Glass. Among the notable illustrators of Alice in the 1980s, 1990s and early 2000s are Barry Moser (1982); Greg Hildebrandt (1990); David Frankland (1996); Lisbeth Zwerger (1999), who used watercolours in her adaptation; Helen Oxenbury (1999), who won two awards, the Kurt Maschler Award in 1999 and the Kate Greenaway Medal in 2000, for her work; and DeLoss McGraw (2001), with his abstract illustrations.
