= Jirai-kei and ryōsan-gata fashion =

Japanese subculture and aesthetic

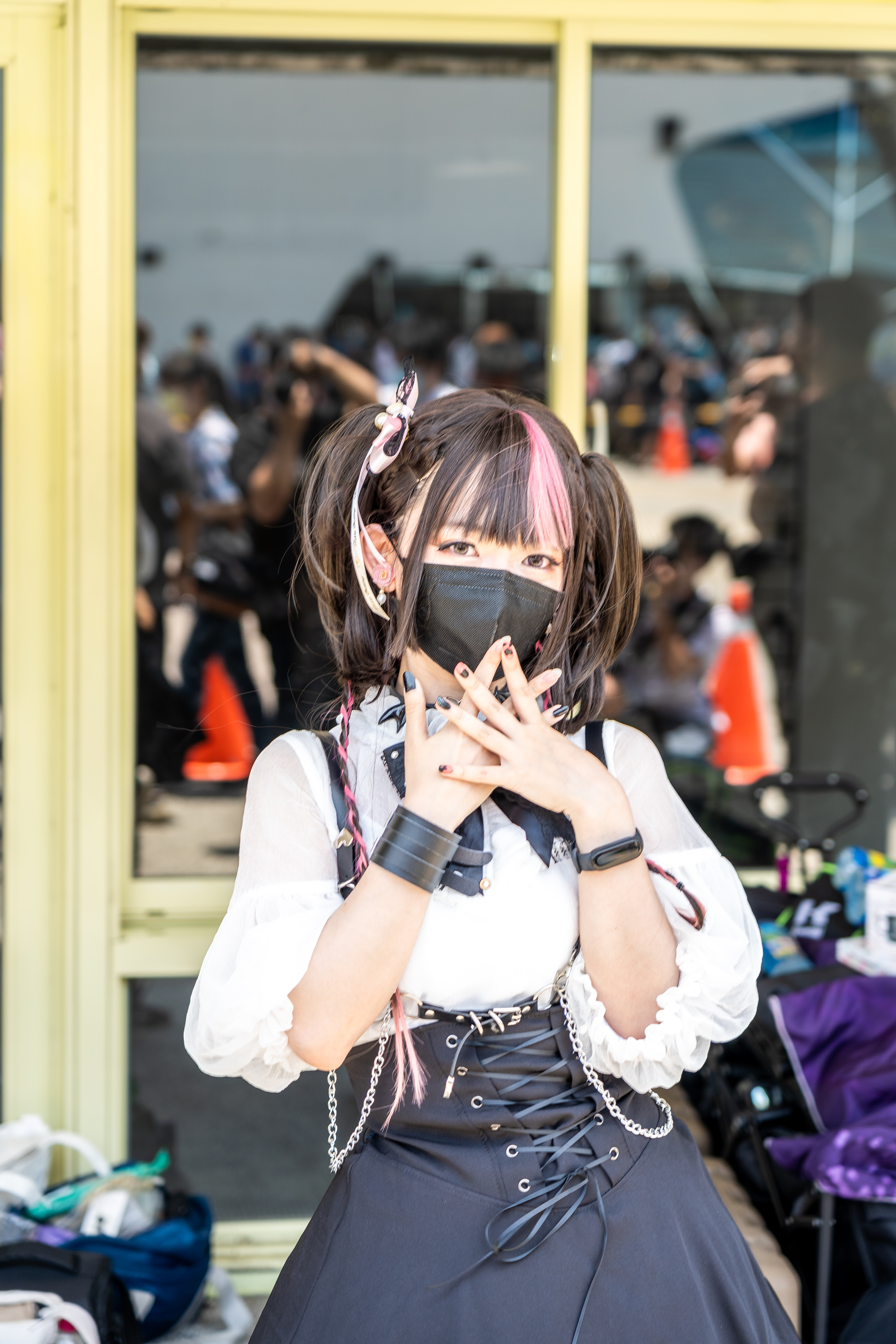
A girl in Taiwan wearing jirai-kei fashion.

Jirai-kei (地雷系; lit. 'landmine style') and ryōsan-gata (量産型; lit. 'mass-produced type') are two related fashion trends that emerged within Japanese youth culture, gaining popularity in the late 2010s through to the 2020s. Both styles are commonly seen amongst young women in Japanese cities and have garnered attention through social media, idol fandom culture and street fashion. As they share certain connections in terms of visual elements and community engagement, they are often discussed together in Japanese media and cultural studies.

Social media such as TikTok and makeup challenge trends on YouTube have helped to popularize jirai-kei, alongside media like Ashita, Watashi wa Dareka no Kanojo and Needy Streamer Overload. Members of the subculture wear a girly fashion style with pastel colors, frills, and ribbons, mixed with darker imagery of crosses and medical items. They often wear contact lenses to make their eyes appear larger, and red makeup underneath their eyes in order to look like they're about to cry.

== Naming ==
The term landmine woman (地雷女, jirai onna), which jirai-kei is derived from, was first used on 2channel in 2010 to describe women with a cute exterior but destructive tendencies, comparing them to a "ticking time bomb". It was sometimes used in men's magazines to refer to women who are "too mentally unstable to date". Over time, the term has come to be used to describe a fashion style characterised by specific visual features.

Ryōsan-gata was a term from the industrial sector meaning mass production. In contemporary Japan, it describes groups of people who follow mainstream trends and share similar styles. Within Japanese youth culture, ryōsan-gata otaku ("mass-produced otaku girls") typically refers to female fans of male idol groups who wear similar styles of clothing at concerts or fan events. Although the two styles differ in cultural context and visual aesthetic, they are often discussed side by side due to the overlap in their target demographics and visual elements.

== Characteristics ==
=== Jirai-kei ===
Jirai-kei has an overall aesthetic based around mixing cute and dark imagery, often pairing pastel colors and frills with darker iconography such as crosses, bandages, syringes, and pills. Outfits feature colour combinations such as black, white and dusky pink, and often consist of blouses and frilly skirts adorned with bows, and platform heels, chunky-heeled Mary Janes, or tall boots. Outfits are often accessorized with chokers, heart-shaped belt buckles, and a bow around the neck.

==== Subcul Jirai ====
Subcul (サブカル, sabukaru), derived from "subculture", is a darker style that draws more influence from other subcultures like punk and streetwear, featuring oversized clothing, loose socks, leg warmers, and arm warmers.

=== Make-up ===
Jirai-kei style makeup video with My Melody and Kuromi decorations

Make-up plays a significant part in the jirai-kei subculture. Techniques include applying red or pink eyeshadow to the lower eyelids as well as a namidabukuro (なみだぶくろ) to create a puffy, tear-stained effect, intended to invoke the pien emoji, paired with drooping eyeliner and large circle contact lenses meant to make the eyes appear larger. Foundation is applied to create a pale complexion, enhancing the overall visual contrast.

=== Visuals ===
Certain iconography and items have become status symbols among the members of the subculture, such as Strong Zero and pink Monster Energy, the Vivienne Westwood globe, MCM's pink logo-print backpack, and Sanrio characters like Kuromi.

The pleading face emoji (🥺), or pien (ぴえん), has also come to be associated with the subculture.

=== Ryōsan-gata ===
Ryōsan-gata fashion typically features soft, muted tones such as pink, beige and white. The style emphasises neatness and harmony, with combinations including tops and skirts adorned with bows, pearls or heart-shaped embellishments. In terms of makeup, ryōsan-gata style typically employs a natural look with pink undertones, incorporating glitter or sequins around the eyes to create a bright yet soft visual effect. Sanrio characters My Melody and Cinnamoroll frequently appear on ryōsan-gata style-related clothing or accessories. Wearers of ryōsan-gata often put their hair up in pigtails.

== Origin and development ==
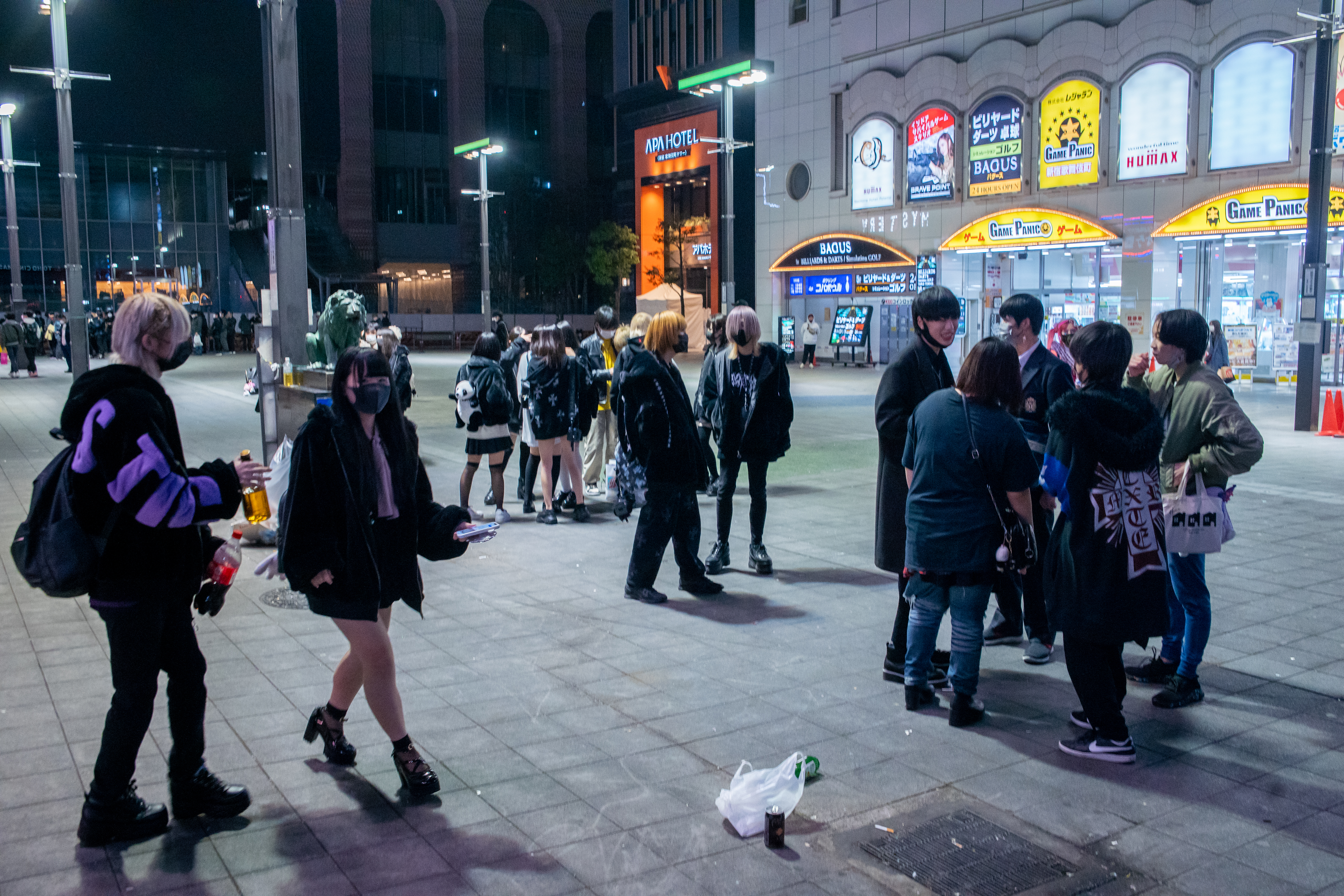
A group of Toyoko kids in Kabukichō Cinecity Square.

The jirai-kei subculture itself was born in Tokyo's nightlife district Kabukichō, which stayed open during the COVID-19 pandemic, which drew in runaway teenagers (known as Toyoko kids) and set the stage for jirai-kei to develop. Kabukichō, and especially Toyoko, has a notable reputation of being unsafe, while its residents view it as a safe refuge from Japanese society, which they often feel isolated from. Living on the streets and often coming from broken homes leads them to engage in self-harm, substance abuse, and obsessive behavior. They often form expensive host club and oshikatsu habits, with some taking up sex work in order to fund these interests.

On social media platforms, these fashion styles have spread to a wider audience through photo-sharing, fashion bloggers and online communities. Many participants showcase their personal style by posting photos of their outfits and makeup looks. Additionally, beauty influencers posted jirai-kei style makeup videos during the pandemic, which also aided in popularizing the style.

As the styles grew in popularity, some Japanese fashion brands and retailers launched clothing lines associated with them. Shopping centres catering to young people, such as Shibuya 109 in Tokyo, have also seen the emergence of clothing brands and products aimed at consumers with similar tastes. Popular brands include MA*RS, Liz Lisa, DearMyLove, Honey Cinnamon, and Ank Rouge.

Jirai-kei fashion has appeared in online fashion communities outside Japan. In China, the style has circulated primarily through social media platforms such as Xiaohongshu (RedNote) and Weibo. In Western countries, it has been adopted within alternative fashion scenes and has sometimes been compared with emo or e-girl aesthetics.

== Cultural impact ==
Followers of jirai-kei and ryōsan-gata fashion are typically active on social media platforms, sharing photographs of their outfits, make-up and accessories. Some use specific online nicknames or hashtags to signal their stylistic identity and maintain community connections through interactions such as liking and commenting. Manga and television series Ashita, Watashi wa Dareka no Kanojo focuses on the dark side of Shinjuku's nightlife, and features a jirai-kei character. The central character of the popular game Needy Streamer Overload is presented as being a member of the subculture. The j-pop idol group =Love wore jirai-kei fashion in their music video for "Shukipi", and a Hatsune Miku song, "The Vampire" by Deco*27, similarly depicts her wearing the style. Jirai kei fashion is often featured in the magazine LARME.

== See also ==
- Lolita fashion
- Gyaru
- Harajuku
- Kawaii
