= Dramatization =

Creation of a dramatic performance of material depicting real or fictional events

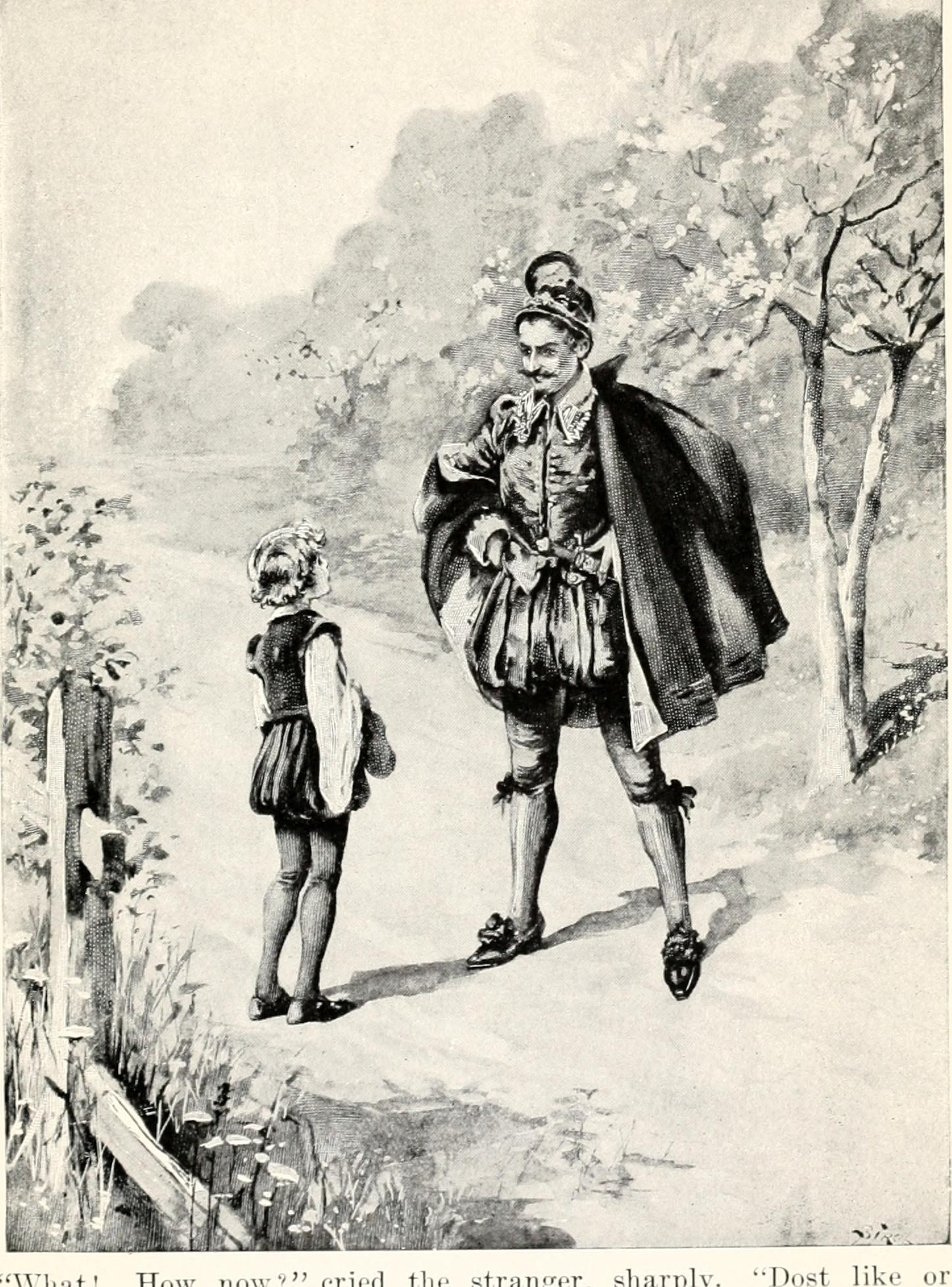
Illustration from a 1909 dramatization of Master Skylark.

A dramatization is the creation of a dramatic performance of material depicting real or fictional events. Dramatization may occur in any media, and can play a role in education and the psychological development of children. The production of a dramatization presents potential legal issues, arising both from the use of elements of fictional works created by others, and with the depiction of real persons and events.

== Usage ==
Dramatization may occur in many circumstances, and be presented in many forms of media:

Dramatization is the acting out of a story, real-life situation, event, feeling, or idea. There are many forms of dramatization, such as plays, puppet theater, radio theater, pantomime, pageants, processionals, parades, clowning, dance, skits, role plays, simulations, interviews, dialogue sermons, monologues, etc. The purpose of a dramatization is to enable the participants to experience, understand, and communicate, in a new and exciting manner, what is being dramatized.

In television, a dramatization is "the preparation of a television drama from a work which was not previously in dramatic form, for example a prose narrative". The form is often used in television commercials depicting the benefits of using an advertised product, "because dramatization is a form particularly well suited to television". Although dramatization and adaptation are sometimes used interchangeably, the BBC distinguishes a dramatization from an adaptation by the criteria that an adaptation is a preparation derived from a dramatic work. When the events being dramatized are historical, this may also be considered a form of historical reenactment, and occurs within the genre of docudrama. In some cases, in conveying the lives of historical figures "dramatization is a necessity due to lack of documentation".

Dramatization has been described as "a primitive instinct and very early people expressed their thoughts and emotions through this medium, or at least through that of pantomime, which is so closely connected with it". In particular, "[w]hen children identify with the various characters in the story, it is natural for them to want to imitate those characters". To a degree, any attempt to describe an event other than in a clinical sense requires some dramatization:

Effective storytelling leads directly to story dramatization. Story dramatization is the re-creation of part or all of a story with the emphasis on spontaneity, cognition, action, identification, dialogue and sequence of events. Greater appreciation of the literature may then occur.

Children, through play, unconsciously begin to act out the dramatization of events in their lives and events of which they learn. Research has shown that "with a variety of students from different grades and socioeconomic backgrounds, through expression of feelings and thoughts in story dramatization and creative drama, self concept is improved".

== Legal issues ==
Legally, the creation of a dramatization may infringe on the intellectual property rights of the work from which it is derived. A dramatization of real events might infringe the personalty rights of the individuals involved. However, it is also understood that the dramatization itself maybe entitled to its own intellectual property protections:

In all countries which recognize an author's rights, the right to dramatize (a novel, short story, or whatever) is held by the author as part of his copyright. The majority of countries assume that there is a point, however, where a dramatization is so remote from the original novel (for example) as to take it outside the dramatization right held by the novelist. The dramatist may be inspired by a dominant idea or theme in a novel, and produce a work which enshrines that idea but has its own set of characters and incidents. [W]hether the work is a faithful dramatization of the novel or whether it is remote and everything but theme, the playwright will enjoy the copyright protection that is given to an 'original' play.

== See also ==
- Novelization
