= William Bowen =

William Bowen may refer to:

- William Bowen (actor) (1666–1718), British stage actor
- William Bowen (rugby union) (1862–1925), rugby union footballer of the 1880s, and 1890s for Wales, and Swansea
- William J. Bowen (1868–1948), American labor union leader
- William Bowen (author) (1877–1937), children's author and Newbery Honor recipient
- William Bowen (British Army officer) (1898–1961), British Army general
- William G. Bowen (1933–2016), former president of Princeton University
- Billy Bowen (1897–1960), rugby union and rugby league footballer of the 1920s for Wales (RU), Swansea, and Leeds (RL)
- Bill Bowen (1929–1999), African-american politician in Ohio
- William Miller Bowen (1862–1937), civic leader in Los Angeles, California
