= Mukokuseki =

Concept in Japanese popular media

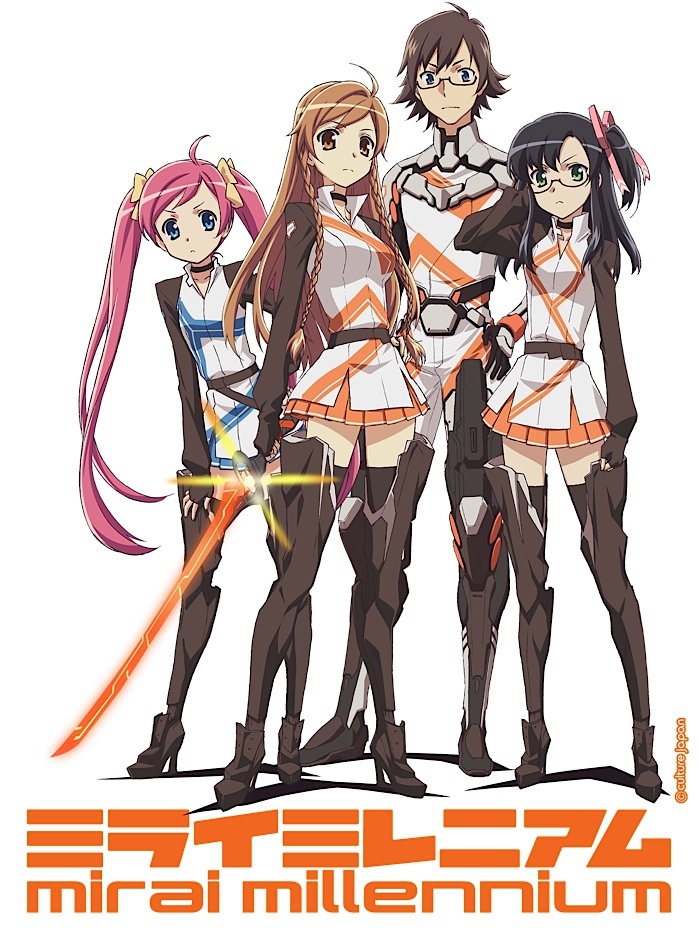
Manga-styled character designs displaying mukokuseki features, such as light hair and eyes

Mukokuseki (Japanese: 無国籍) is the Japanese term for "statelessness" or "nationlessness". The term is sometimes used to describe fictional characters depicted without a concrete ethnicity or nationality, particularly in anime and manga. It is commonly invoked in criticism of Japanese media. It is thought to be particularly significant in the context of foreign influences on Japanese entertainment properties as well as the subsequent marketing of such properties towards non-Japanese audiences.

Notable examples of mukokuseki characters include Hello Kitty, Light Yagami, and Mario, and the term has also been applied to writers like Murakami Haruki akin to a literary genre.

== History ==
Implications of the term in visual media can vary considerably between artstyles, either employing culturally neutral elements or hybridizing multiple disparate cultural influences. One author nonetheless argued that "[o]n closer inspection [...] the communication of cultural markers and characteristics is far more intricate than the mere display of Japanese facial features."

Asian studies scholars Birlea Oana-Maria and Christine Yano analyzed mukokuseki as closely related to the aesthetic of kawaii, an abstract concept of "cuteness" or "loveliness" considered central to the marketing and international appeal of Japanese artistic and commercial properties like Hello Kitty. Yano identified the cosmopolitan success of Hello Kitty in the 1970s as a trailblazer of the mukokuseki style and an indicator of a marketing strategy she coined as Pink Globalization, but argued that rather than separating the subject from established ethnic categories mukokuseki was instead "imbued with Euro-American culture or race", summarized by a commentator as a discourse in which "anything but a white, Anglo-Saxon, Protestant is considered 'ethnic culture' by most people."

One postulated reason for the rise of mukokuseki as a style is the desire to market Japanese products worldwide without making it obvious that they are Japanese, due to enduring anti-Japanese sentiment in the United States as well as many neighboring Asian countries, particularly as a result of Japanese war crimes in World War II. The mukokuseki fiction of Murakami was noted as transgressing historic divisions like those between Japan and China, achieving a level of popular culture ubiquity in both the mainland and Taiwan and becoming the first Japanese author to be widely considered in the latter following a diplomatic row between Japan and the Republic of China over Japan's 1972 recognition of the People's Republic of China. Murakami, a self-described "black sheep" of the Japanese literary establishment, has made similar headway in the historically hostile South Korea and is credited with inspiring a trans-national movement of other East Asian writers across the region.

== Impacts and influences ==
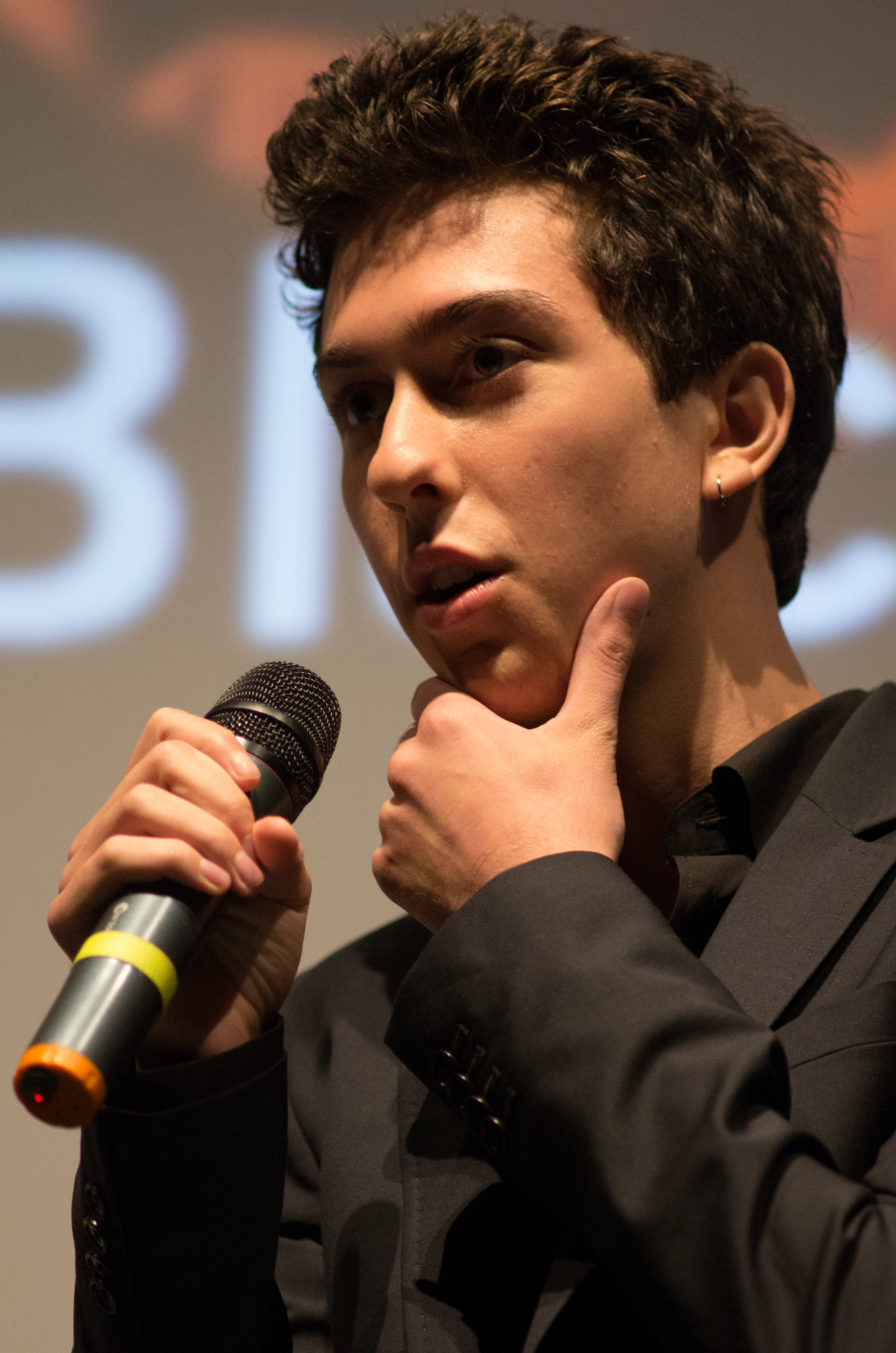
Actor Nat Wolff portrayed Light Turner, a Caucasian American depiction of the racially ambiguous Light Yagami, in the 2017 film adaptation of the Death Note manga.

In addition to the increased international appeal of culturally neutral properties, Brian Ruh paraphrased Susan J. Napier in describing mukokuseki as "a way for contemporary Japanese to playfully escape their own concepts of Japan and their own feelings of Japaneseness... fantasized mukokuseki anime bodies can be free from the cultural and societal baggage of physical bodies." Other popular narratives have stated that, due to their fictionalized or aestheticized settings and "abstracted" representations of the human body, manga and anime are inherently divorced from real-life categories of ethnicities and that their characters are therefore all naturally mukokuseki.

A Language Awareness study of Japanese popular media found traits such as blond hair and marked speech were widely used as shorthand for depicting foreign characters, described as a "quintessential" image of foreigners, with Americans being the most affected nationality. Asian studies scholar Laura Miller noted the increasing prevalence of light-colored hair and blue eyes as cosmetic choices in J-pop scenes and other fields of Japanese youth culture, emphasizing the impacts these aesthetics have on conventional perceptions of race and nationality.

== Criticism ==
Mukokuseki has particularly received some criticism in the context of the soft power it does or does not afford Japanese culture in the Western world, with the lack of distinct Japanese values described as rendering the cultural capital of Japanese media "nothing but an illusion". A writer for Comic Book Resources also criticized Western film adaptations for taking mukokuseki characters as an opportunity to whitewash lead roles in works such as The Last Airbender (2010) or Death Note (2017).

== See also ==
- Glossary of anime and manga
- Anime § Globalization and cultural impact
- Racial passing
- Genderless fashion in Japan
