= Julia Magruder =

American novelist (1854–1907)

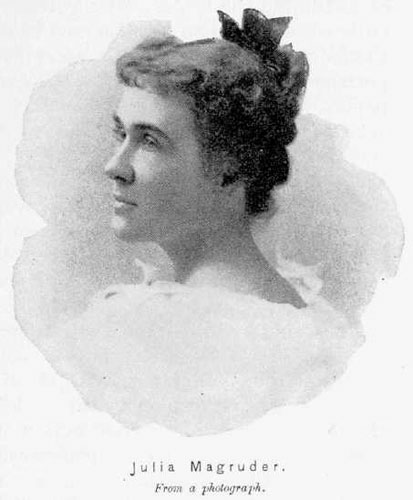
- Sketch of Magruder from Munsey's Magazine, 1895
- Born: September 14, 1854; Charlottesville, Virginia, US
- Died: June 9, 1907 (aged 52); Richmond, Virginia, US
- Resting place: Maplewood Cemetery, Charlottesville
- Occupations: Novelist, short story writer
- Writing career
- Genres: Romantic fiction, children's stories

Julia Magruder (September 14, 1854 – June 9, 1907) was an American novelist. Most of her novels are love stories in which the heroine must face obstacles in pursuit of her goal to find true love. Several of her novels were serialized in the Ladies' Home Journal. A week before her death she received the award from the Académie Française for which she had been nominated a year earlier.

== Early life ==
Julia Magruder was born in Charlottesville, Virginia, in 1854. She grew up during the American Civil War, an experience that informed her sympathetic portrayals of the South in her later work. She was the youngest of the three daughters of Allan Bowie Magruder, a prominent Virginia lawyer, and his wife, Sarah née Gilliam.

Magruder spent her early childhood in Charlottesville. At three, the family moved to Washington, where her father practiced law and she and her sisters began their schooling. The family divided their time between Washington and Virginia, where Magruder and her sisters were educated by their parents and governesses. During this period, she developed a deep admiration for George Eliot.

== Career ==
As a child, Magruder showed no sign of writing talent, but she published her first story, "My Three Chances," in a Southern newspaper at sixteen. Encouraged by its reception, she went on to write sketches, children's stories, fiction, and short magazine pieces in rapid succession. Her first important work, Across the Chasm (1885), appeared anonymously in Ladies' Home Journal. The story follows a Southern girl who marries a Northern man, and examines the prejudices of both regions.

== Personal life ==
A close friend, Amélie Rives Troubetzkoy, often hosted her at Castle Hill, where she did some of her writing.

The following physical description of Magruder appeared in Ladies Home Journal:

"Miss Magruder is quite above medium height, and of slight but beautifully proportioned figure. Her head is small and well-shaped, and her hair, which she wears low, is light brown in color. Her complexion is fair, and her eyes gray and very expressive. She dresses in the simplest taste, wearing usually, although she is not in mourning, black, white or gray."

== Death ==
In 1907, Magruder died of kidney failure in Richmond, Virginia.

== Recognition ==
About a year before she died, the French government nominated her for the Ordre des Palmes Académiques (transl. Order of the Palms), a distinction rarely awarded to Americans. After a delay caused by a change in the French cabinet, the decoration arrived a week before her death.

== Bibliography ==
- Across the Chasm (1885) Charles Scribner's Sons, New York
- At Anchor (1887) A story of our Civil War, J. B. Lippincott & Co., Philadelphia
- Honored in the Breach (1888)
- A Magnificent Plebeian (1888) Harper & Brothers, New York
- A Live Ember (1892) Ladies Home Journal (serial)
- The Child Amy (1894) Lothrop Publishing Company
- The Southern Girl (1894)
- Child-sketches from George Eliot (1895) Lothrop Publishing Company, Boston, Illustrated by R.B. Birch and Amy Brooks.
- The Princess Sonia (1895) The Century Company, New York
- The Violet (1896) Longmans, Green and Co.
- A Realized Ideal (1898) Herbert Stone & Co.
- Dead Selves (1898) J. B. Lippincott Company
- Labor of Love (1898) Lothrop Publishing Company
- A Heaven-Kissing Hill (1899) H. S. Stone
- A Beautiful Alien (1900) Richard G. Badger & Co.
- A Manifest Destiny (1900) Harper
- The Voice in the Choir (1900) Ladies Home Journal (serial)
- A Sunny Southerner (1901) L.C. Page & Company
- Struan (1903) RTichard G. Badger, Boston
- Her Husband, The Mystery of a Man (1911) Small, Maynard and Company

=== Short stories and magazine articles ===
- "The Secret of the White Castle" (Nov. 1895) The Black Cat, The Shortstory Publishing Co., Boston, Massachusetts.
- Miss Ayr of Virginia & other stories (1896) Herbert S. Stone
- "Sister Mary of Meekness" (Nov. 1896) The Penny Magazine (short story)
