= The Admiral's Caravan =

1892 novel by Charles E. Carryl

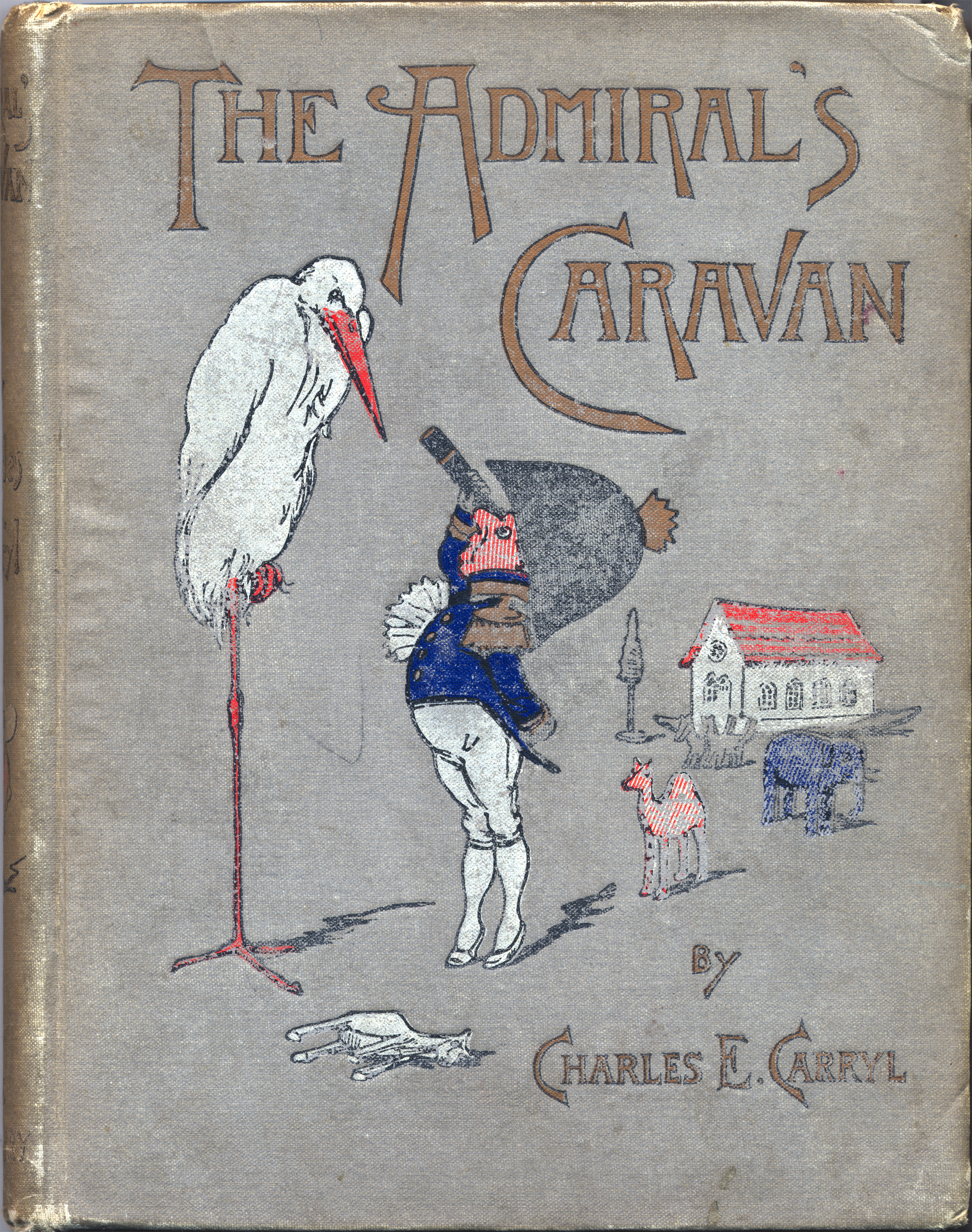
- First edition cover of The Admiral's Caravan
- Author: Charles E. Carryl
- Language: English
- Genre: Fantasy novel, Parody
- Publisher: The Century Co.
- Publication date: 1892
- Publication place: United States
- Media type: Print (Hardback)
- Pages: 140

The Admiral's Caravan is a novel by Charles E. Carryl, written in 1891 and published by the Century Company of New York in 1892. It is one of many literary "imitations" inspired by Lewis Carroll's two books, Alice's Adventures in Wonderland (1865) and Through the Looking-Glass (1871). It appeared in serialized form in the children's periodical St Nicholas beginning in 1891.

The story is about a young girl named Dorothy who takes a journey with three wooden statues who come alive on Christmas Eve.

The book features line drawings by Reginald Bathurst Birch.

In 1885, Carryl published another book inspired by Alice's Adventures in Wonderland, called Davy and the Goblin.

== Bibliography ==
- Carryl, Charles Edward (2011) The Admiral's Caravan. Evertype. ISBN 978-1-904808-66-4
