= Imaginotions; Truthless Tales =

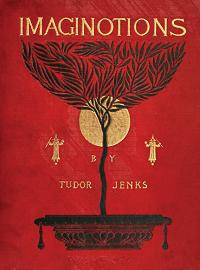
- Cover of the first edition
- Author: Tudor Jenks
- Language: English
- Genre: Fantasy
- Publisher: The Century Co.
- Publication date: 1894
- Publication place: United States
- Media type: Print (hardcover)
- Pages: 230 pp

Imaginotions; Truthless Tales is a collection of nineteen children's fantasy stories by Tudor Jenks. It was first published in hardcover by The Century Co. in 1894; the first British edition was published by T. Fisher Unwin in 1900. Illustrators included Reginald B. Birch, W. H. Drake, E. B. Bensell, Dan Beard, and Oliver Herford. The stories had previously been published in St. Nicholas Magazine between 1883 and 1894.

The collection was the author's second published book. The stories are typical of Jenks' early work, many being told in the first person and with an air of gentle irony.

== Contents ==
- "Prehistoric Photography"
- "The Tongaloo Tournament"
- "The Dragon's Story"
- "A Duel in a Desert"
- "The Sequel"
- "A Lost Opportunity"
- "The Astrologer's Niece"
- "The Astrologer's Niece Marries"
- "The Winning of Vanella"
- "The Professor and the Patagonian Giant"
- "The Prince's Councilors"
- "Teddy and the Wolf"
- "Little Plunkett's Cousin"
- "Professor Chipmunk's Surprising Adventure"
- "The Satchel"
- "Good Neighbors"
- "Anthony and the Ancients"
- "A Yarn of Sailor Ben's"
- "The Statue"
