= The Old Tobacco Shop =

1921 fantasy children's book

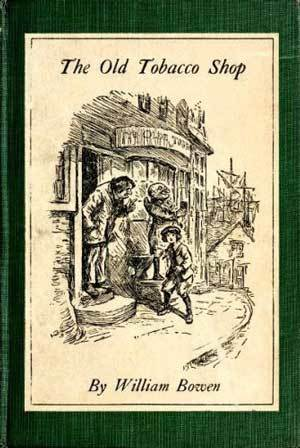
- 1921 hardback cover
- Author: William Bowen
- Illustrator: Reginald Birch
- Language: English
- Genre: Children's fantasy
- Publisher: Macmillan Inc.
- Publication date: 1921
- Publication place: United States
- Pages: 236
- ISBN: 9789997488671
- OCLC: 573218

The Old Tobacco Shop: A True Account of What Befell a Little Boy in Search of Adventure is a children's fantasy novel by William Bowen that was named a Newbery Honor book. The novel, published by MacMillan in 1921, is illustrated by Reginald Birch.

== Plot ==
Five-year-old Freddie meets the owner of a nearby tobacco shop, Mr. Toby Littleback; his old-maid aunt, Aunt Amanda; and Mr. Punch, a hunchbacked man who sits outside the shop holding cigars. Toby warns young Freddie never to touch the jar shaped like a Chinese man's head because it is filled with magic tobacco. Freddie can't resist, and after smoking the tobacco, he finds himself and his friends on The Sieve, a leaky ship on the Spanish Main. They are first captured by pirates, then escape with the pirate treasure. Later, they meet a Persian rug merchant who gives each of them their heart's desire. In the end, Freddie falls ill and goes into a coma. When he awakens, he finds himself at home, recovered from the tobacco-induced dream.

== Background ==
The Old Tobacco Shop was illustrated by Reginald Birch, a highly regarded artist of the time. Bowen composed a poem about Birch that appeared in The Century.

In The Independent and the Weekly Review, Edmund Pearson reported that the word "tobacco" in the title caused one bookseller to consider the book unsuitable for children and refuse to carry it. Pearson, however, said the book "passed the purifying test of examination by three children's librarians while it was still in manuscript, and no parent need fear that there is anything in it which will teach children to chew, smoke, or swear".

== Critical reception and awards ==
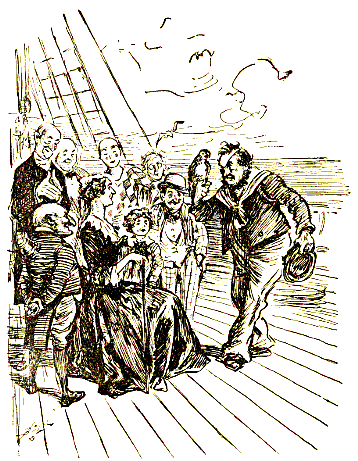
Illustration by Reginald Birch from Bowen's "The Old Tobacco Shop".

Booklist called The Old Tobacco Shop a "fantastic story... It savors a little of Dickens". Publishers Weekly wrote, "Whether the Freddies or the fathers will like this fantastic tale most, it is hard to say". Anne Carroll Moore agreed, writing in "High Lights in Children's Books" that "It will give pure joy to boys and their fathers".

The Old Tobacco Shop received a special runner-up citation from the Newbery committee in 1922, the first year the Newbery was awarded. According to Barbara Elleman in The Newbery and Caldecott Awards, the award was originally based on votes by a selected jury of officers from the Children's Librarian Section. Hendrik van Loon's book The Story of Mankind won the award with 163 votes out of the 212 cast. The Old Tobacco Shop came in fourth with five votes. All previous runner-up citations were converted to Honor Awards in 1971.
