= The Pigtail of Ah Lee Ben Loo =

The Pigtail of Ah Lee Ben Loo with Seventeen other Laughable Tales and 200 Comical Silhouettes
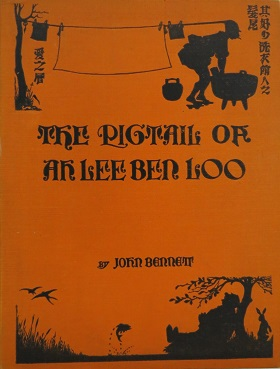
- Author: John Bennett
- Illustrator: John Bennett
- Cover artist: John Bennett
- Language: English
- Genre: Children's literature
- Publisher: Longmans, Green, and Co.
- Publication date: 1928
- Publication place: United States

The Pigtail of Ah Lee Ben Loo with Seventeen other Laughable Tales and 200 Comical Silhouettes is a children's book anthology of fairy tales and short stories collected and illustrated by John Bennett. The stories are written in verse or prose, illustrated by Bennett in silhouette style. Several stories are reprints from earlier publications or adaptations. The book was a Newbery Honor recipient in 1929.

== Collected stories ==
- The Pigtail of Ah Lee Ben Loo
- The Astonishing Story of the Caliph's Clock
- Ye Lily Mayden and Ye Lyttle Taylor-Boye
- The Story of the Fool Who Was Willing
- The Proud Miss O'Haggin
- Abijah's Fourth of July
- Little Peter and the Giant
- A Jest of Little John
- The Land of the Impossible (reprinted from The Bachelor and Johnson Syndicate)
- The Cat, the Cow, the Dog, and the Dairymaid
- The Persian Columbus
- The Barber of Sari-Ann
- Fritz the Master Fiddler
- Ben Ali the Egyptian
- Granger Grind and Farmer Mellow
- How Cats Came to Purr
- Ye Ballad of Scullion Jack
- Hans the Otherwise
- Ye Olde Thyme Tayle (When Knights were Bold reprinted from Life)
- The Merry Pieman and the Don's Daughter (reprinted from The Bachelor and Johnson Syndicate)
- The Basket (reprinted from Good Housekeeping; adapted from Hans Sachs)
- How It All Ended
