= Tomorrow, I'll Be Someone's Girlfriend =

Japanese manga series

- First tankōbon volume cover

明日、私は誰かのカノジョ (Ashita, Watashi wa Dareka no Kanojo)
- Genre: Romance
- Manga
- Written by: Hinao Wono
- Published by: Cygames (web); Shogakukan (print)
- Imprint: Ura Sunday Comics
- Magazine: Cycomi
- Original run: May 3, 2019 – November 10, 2023
- Volumes: 17
- Television drama
- Directed by: Mai Sakai; Sachiko Kondo; Masato Sugawara
- Written by: Kisa Miura; Anna Kawahara; Lee Nawon
- Licensed by: Disney Platform Distribution
- Original network: MBS, TBS
- Original run: April 13, 2022 – June 28, 2023
- Episodes: 21

Tomorrow, I'll Be Someone's Girlfriend (Japanese: 明日、私は誰かのカノジョ, Hepburn: Ashita, Watashi wa Dareka no Kanojo) is a Japanese anthology web manga series written and illustrated by Hinao Wono. It was serialized on Cygames's online magazine Cycomi from May 2019 to November 2023, with its chapters collected and published in print by Shogakukan in 17 tankōbon volumes.

A 12-episode television drama adaptation aired from April to June 2022. A second season aired from May to June 2023.

The manga had over 5.6 million copies in circulation by August 2023. In 2023, the manga won the 68th Shogakukan Manga Award for the shōjo category.

== Plot ==
The story is about college student Yuki, who accepts money to pretend to be men's dates and hold hands with them. Yuki has burn scars on her face, but covers them with makeup while working as a rental girlfriend.

== Media ==
=== Manga ===
Written and illustrated by Hinao Wono, Ashita, Watashi wa Dareka no Kanojo started on Cygames's online magazine Cycomi on May 3, 2019. The series finished with its 215th chapter on October 13, 2023, which was followed by an epilogue chapter released on November 10 of the same year. A special chapter was published on February 16, 2024. Its chapters were collected and published in print by Shogakukan in 17 tankōbon volumes, released from December 19, 2019, to February 19, 2024.

==== Volumes ====
No.	Release date	ISBN
1	December 19, 2019	978-4-09-129494-4
2	March 19, 2020	978-4-09-850030-7
3	May 19, 2020	978-4-09-850051-2
4	September 18, 2020	978-4-09-850253-0
5	December 18, 2020	978-4-09-850354-4
6	March 19, 2021	978-4-09-850447-3
7	June 17, 2021	978-4-09-850587-6
8	September 16, 2021	978-4-09-850655-2
9	December 17, 2021	978-4-09-850777-1
10	April 19, 2022	978-4-09-851043-6
11	July 19, 2022	978-4-09-851212-6
12	October 19, 2022	978-4-09-851254-6
13	February 17, 2023	978-4-09-851436-6
14	May 19, 2023	97-84-09-851557-8
15	August 18, 2023	978-4-09-852798-4
16	November 17, 2023	978-4-09-853045-8
17	February 19, 2024	978-4-09-853136-3

=== Drama ===
In March 2022, it was announced that the series would receive a television drama adaptation. It aired on MBS and TBS from April 13 to June 29, 2022. (Note: MBS listed the air dates for the series on Tuesday at 24:59, which is effectively Wednesday at 0:59 a.m. JST.) Disney Platform Distribution licensed the series for streaming worldwide.

A second season of the series was announced in April 2023. It aired from May 2 to June 28, 2023.

== Reception ==
In 2020, the manga was among 50 nominees for the sixth Next Manga Awards in the web category.

By March 2022, the manga had over 300,000 copies in circulation. By August 2023, it had over 5.6 million copies in circulation.

The series ranked 18th on Takarajimasha's Kono Manga ga Sugoi! 2022 list of best manga for male readers. The series won the 68th Shogakukan Manga Award in the shōjo category in 2023.
