= Virginia Woodward Cloud =

American writer (1861–1938)

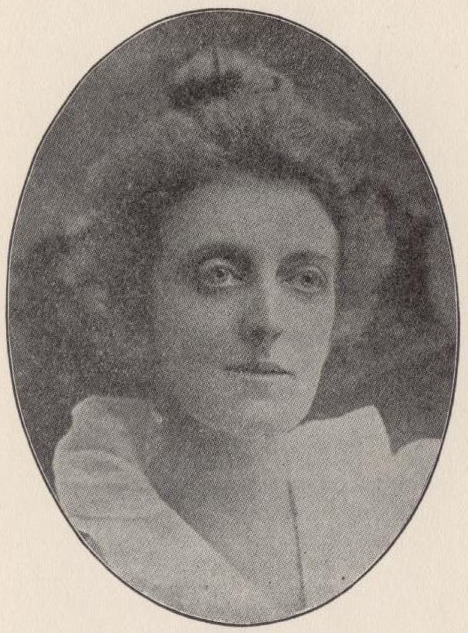
- Virginia Woodward Cloud circa 1913
- Born: 1861; Baltimore
- Died: April 4, 1938 (aged 76–77); Baltimore
- Occupation: Writer, poet

Virginia Woodward Cloud (1861 – April 4, 1938) was an American writer.

== Early life and education ==
Virginia Woodward Cloud was born in 1861 in Baltimore, Maryland, the daughter of Maria (Woodward) and Daniel Cloud, a banker.

== Career ==
Cloud's writing career began in 1893. She was literary editor of the Baltimore News from 1906 to 1914 and a member of the board of the Woman's Literary Club of Baltimore.

Cloud wrote poetry and short stories, some of which were about the colonial and revolutionary eras in American history. Some of her poems were written in "Negro dialect". She published in Harper's Magazine, The Century Magazine, and Atlantic Monthly.

== Personal life ==
Cloud was friends with Lizette Woodworth Reese. She died on April 4, 1938, aged 76 or 77, in Baltimore.

== Books ==
- Down Durley Lane and Other Ballads (1898)
- A Reed by the River (1902)
- From an Old Garden (1922)
- Candlelight (1924)
- The Collected Poems of Virginia Woodward Cloud (1939)
