= Edgar White Burrill =

American radio personality (1883–1958)

Edgar White Burrill (June 8, 1883 – December 5, 1958) was an American critic and lecturer on books and the literary scene who organized the 1920s Literary Vespers series held at Aeolian Hall and Town Hall. Burrill was a major precursor to radio drama with his dramatic radio readings during the 1920s and 1930s, and one of these readings led to a milestone in broadcasting. He was a professor of English at Northwestern University.

Burrill was born in Boston and graduated from Amherst College in the year 1906, a member of the Phi Delta Theta fraternity. He received his master's degree in 1910 from Lake Forest University and Northwestern before becoming a Northwestern professor.

He gave annual readings of Ida M. Tarbell's He Knew Lincoln on WJZ during the 1920s. His reading in 1923 inspired George Furness of the National Carbon Company to produce The Eveready Hour, the first commercially sponsored variety program in the history of broadcasting.

In 1925, he gave a recitation of Henry Wadsworth Longfellow's Evangeline on radio with a musical background by Max Jacob's Chamber Symphony Orchestra. This was broadcast on Tuesday, November 24, 1925, at 9 pm over WEAF, WEEI, WFI, WCAE, WGR, WWJ, WSAI, WTAG, WOC, WCCO and KSD.

The following year, he was heard on WJZ conducting the opening Literary Vespers of the 1926–27 season from Aeolian Hall. The subject Burrill selected for the opening Vespers was "The Mask of Civilization," along with a discussion of Eugene O'Neill's The Great God Brown.

In 1931, Burrill told "The Story of Our Flag" over WJZ as part of the Flag Day celebration, and he took part in a Memorial Day broadcast that same year.

Burrill did some of his writing as a guest at the Yaddo artists retreat. His play Master Skylark, an adaptation of John Bennett's story of Shakespeare's times, was a staple of children's theater during the 1920s.

He died in San Francisco in 1958.
