= Master Skylark =

Children's book by American author John Bennett

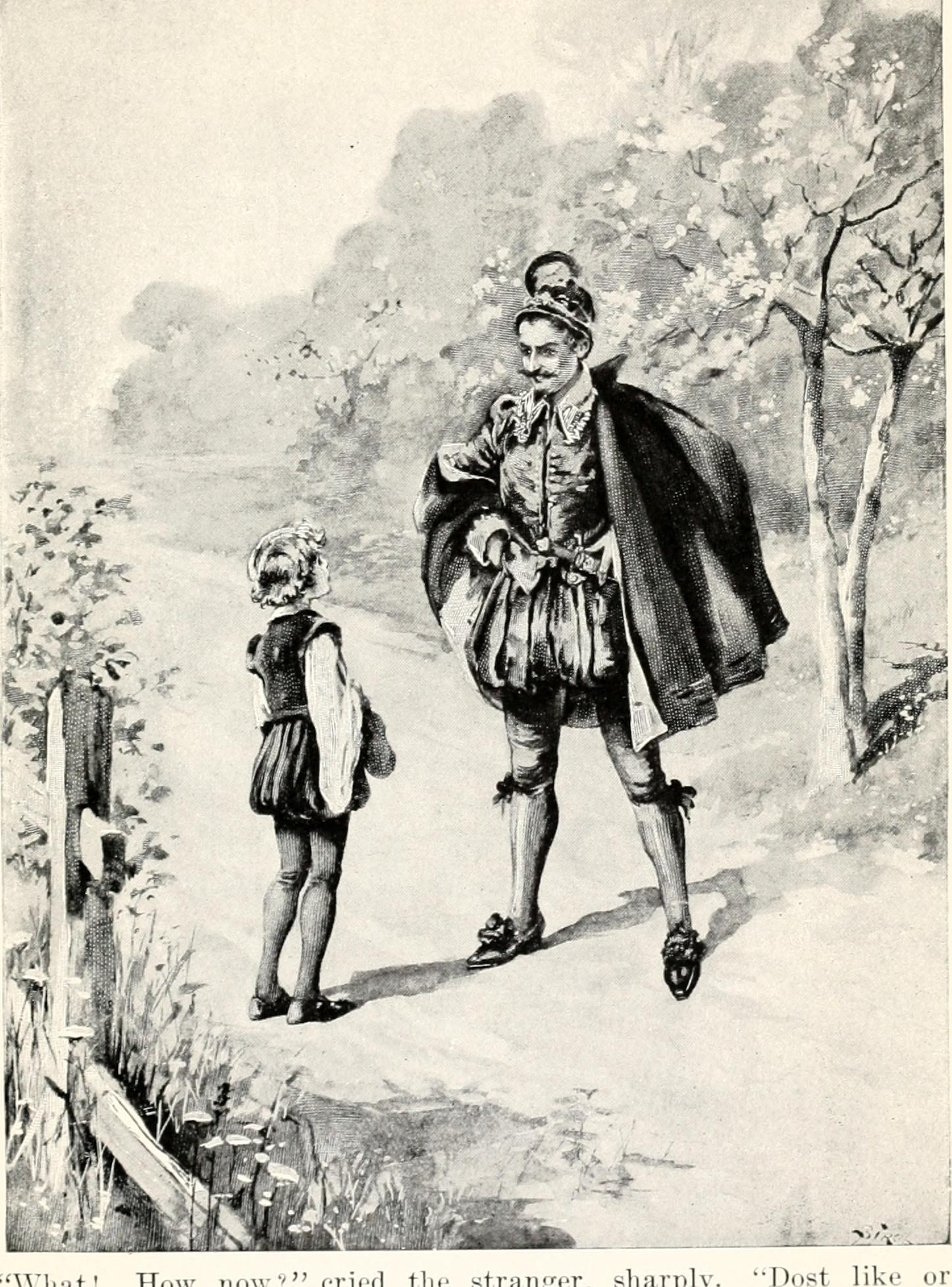
Illustration from a 1909 dramatization of Master Skylark.

Master Skylark: A Story of Shakspere's Time is a best-selling 1897 children's book by American author John Bennett, about a child growing up in Shakespearean times who is kidnapped for his beautiful singing voice, and ultimately rescued and returned home with the aid of William Shakespeare and other noted figures of the time. The original edition contained illustrations by Reginald Bathurst Birch.

The plot is summed up as: "The adventures of the choir boy of Stratford-on-Avon–kidnapped by strolling players, and taken to London, where he sings before Queen Bess–move amid such glowing figures as Ben Jonson and Thomas Heywood, and such scenes as Shakespeare's own village, and the stage of his career in London". The kidnapper is described as "the master-player of the Lord High Admiral's players", and the story eventually has the boy liberated from this capture, after which, "forsaking his triumphs, he wanders home to Stratford". In 1898, The New York Times included it on its list of "Last Year's Best Books", writing:

Bennett's "Master Skylark" Is a story of Shakespeare's time, with plenty of local color and carefully studied. It can be made useful by a stimulating teacher in connection with the reading of Shakespeare in school, but the allusion to the Coventry plays and other customs of the times mean little to the children who have no wider reading than the boys and girls of a grammar school. It is an ideal book for a child of ten or twelve in a Shakespeare-loving family, or small school where the English counties are a part of the children's training in geography.

A reviewer for The Academy and Literature wrote that "[t]here is some sort of literary conscience about Mr. Bennett, and he has contrived to write a story that is picturesque and charming beyond what is common". The book was popular in its day, and remained a best-seller for some time.

The book was adapted into a play at several times, including a noted five-act dramatization by Edgar White Burrill prepared to coincide with the three-hundredth anniversary of the death of William Shakespeare. One review of the play found that "'Master Skylark' has little value as drama, but as entertainment it provides a lively and colorful spectacle of Shakespeare's time, full of action and atmosphere".
