= John Bennett (author) =

American writer (1865–1956)

- Born: May 14, 1865; Chillicothe, Ohio, US
- Died: December 28, 1956 (aged 91)
- Occupations: Writer, illustrator
- Spouse: Susan Smythe
- Writing career
- Genres: Children's books, short stories, poetry
- Notable work: Master Skylark

John Bennett (May 14, 1865 – December 28, 1956) was an American author who is best known for the children's books that he wrote and illustrated. Some of them are anthologies of stories based on black folk tales, especially those drawn from the Gullah culture. He is considered to be a leading figure of the Charleston Renaissance.

== Early years and education ==
Bennett was born in Chillicothe, Ohio, the son of a merchant. He learned to draw as a child, becoming skilled at the art of cutting silhouettes. He dropped out of high school to work for a newspaper, subsequently become a freelance author and illustrator. These were difficult years financially, and he developed eyestrain and depression that he treated with patent medicines containing cocaine, which led to addiction. By 1891 he had recovered, and that year he began contributing regularly to St. Nicholas Magazine, a children's monthly.

Bennett was largely self-educated as an illustrator. He wanted to go to art school, but he was not able to afford it until the mid-1890s, when he enrolled in the Art Students' League in New York. When his 1897 children's book Master Skylark became a bestseller, he dropped out of art school to become a full-time writer.

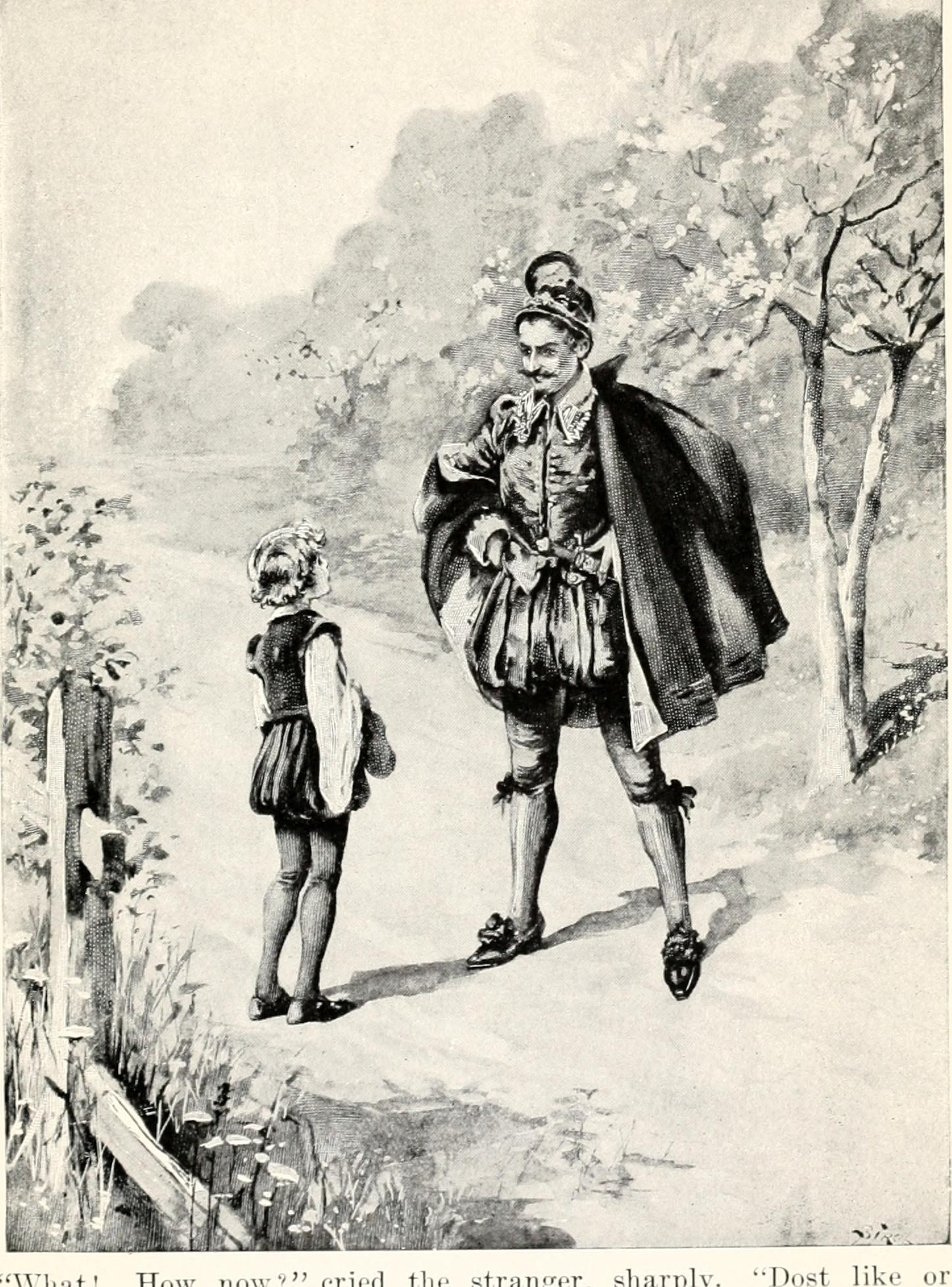
Illustration from a 1909 dramatization of Master Skylark.

== Writing career ==
By 1895, Bennett was well launched on his career as an author. Following a suggestion from his sister, he wrote a children's book about a boy in Elizabethan England who is kidnapped into a company of actors. Master Skylark (1897), first serialized in St. Nicholas and later issued in book form, became a bestseller. Considered a classic of children's literature, it has never been out of print, and it was on a 1956 McCall's magazine list of the 100 best books of all time. It has been dramatized several times, by Edgar White Burrill among others.

When Bennett experienced further health problems, his doctor advised him to recuperate in a warm climate. In 1898 he moved to Charleston, South Carolina, where he had friends. He married Susan Smythe, the daughter of a prominent Charleston family, and became active in promoting culture in the city. He began to incorporate black folktales and the Gullah language into his lectures and stories. For example, his 1906 book The Treasure of Peyre Gaillard (which is set on the plantation of Medway) prominently features Gullah tales, and in 1908-09 he published a two-part article on the Gullah language in the South Atlantic Quarterly. The article displays his uneasy relationship to black culture: although he was interested in preserving Gullah folktales (and would later become a champion of the work of DuBose Heyward), he considered Gullah "a grotesque patois". As a consequence of his interest in black culture, he was ostracized for a time by Charleston's upper social circles. This led to yet another cycle of illness and addiction that prevented him from writing for a time.

When World War I began, Bennett took part in volunteer work in Charleston that ended his social isolation. The years between the two world wars saw a revitalization of the arts in the city that became known as the Charleston Renaissance. A leader in this effort, Bennett worked with Hervey Allen and DuBose Heyward to found the Poetry Society of South Carolina, which sponsored visits by many of the distinguished poets of the day.

In subsequent decades, Bennett published three more books that grew out of his interest in folk tales, including Madame Margot: A Grotesque Legend of Old Charleston (1921) and The Doctor to the Dead: Grotesque Legends and Folk Tales of Old Charleston (1946). The most successful of these was his 1928 collection of international folk tales, The Pigtail of Ah Lee Ben Loo; it was a runner-up for the 1929 Newbery Award. Although it went out of print within a decade, the 200 vibrant silhouettes he created to illustrate the book are still admired.

His papers are held by the South Carolina Historical Society.

== Books ==
- Master Skylark: A Story of Shakespeare's Time (1897)
- Barnaby Lee (1900)
- The Treasure of Peyre Gaillard (1906)
- Madame Margot: A Grotesque Legend of Old Charleston (1921)
- The Pigtail of Ah Lee Ben Loo: With Seventeen Other Laughable Tales & 200 Comical Silhouettes (1928)
- The Doctor to the Dead: Grotesque Legends and Folk Tales of Old Charleston (1946)
