= William Bowen (author) =

American attorney and children's writer

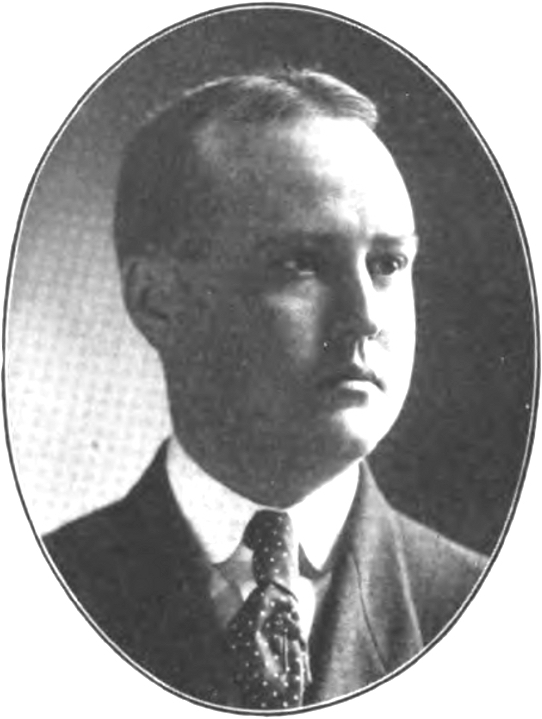
- Born: William Bowen; May 15, 1877; Baltimore, Maryland, US
- Died: September 18, 1937 (aged 60); California
- Occupation: Writer
- Writing career
- Genres: Children's literature, fantasy
- Notable work: The Old Tobacco Shop

William Alvin Bowen (May 15, 1877–September 18, 1937) was an American attorney who wrote several children's books in the 1920s. His most notable work was The Old Tobacco Shop, a fantasy novel that was one runner-up for the inaugural Newbery Medal in 1922.

Bowen was born in Baltimore, Maryland, earned a Bachelor of Laws degree from the University of Maryland in 1898, and worked in his father's law office until 1904, when he moved to Los Angeles. There he was a member of the Olympic Committee as attorney for the 1932 Summer Olympics. He was also a member of the California and Southern California Historical Societies.

Bowen's first children's book was The Enchanted Forest, a fantasy novel published by Macmillan late in 1920. His second was The Old Tobacco Shop, one year later.

== Works ==
- The Enchanted Forest, illustrated by Maud and Miska Petersham (The Macmillan Company, 1920)
- The Old Tobacco Shop: A True Account of What Befell a Little Boy in Search of Adventure, illus. Reginald Birch (Macmillan, Nov 1921)
- Solario the Tailor: His Tales of the Magic Doublet, illus. J. Ormsbee (Macmillan, Sep 1922) – sequel to The Enchanted Forest
- Merrimeg, illus. Emma Brock (Macmillan, 1923), LCCN 23-13190
- Philip and the Faun, illus. N. Choate (Little, Brown and Company, Sep 1926)
- Gossip from the Sixteenth Century (Los Angeles: The Zamorano Club, 1938), LCCN 39-5254
