= Tudor Jenks =

American novelist (1857–1922)

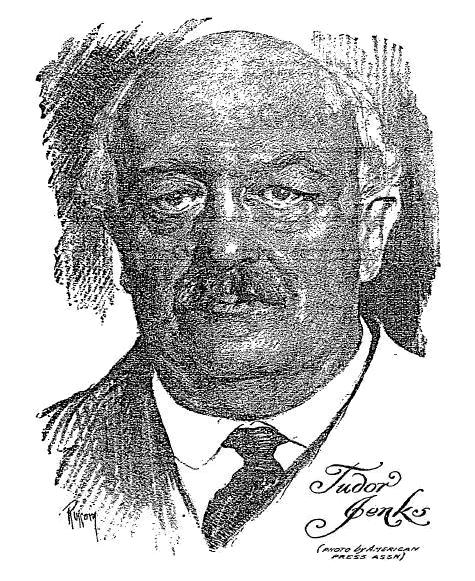
- Tudor Jenks.
- Born: May 7, 1857; Brooklyn, New York
- Died: February 11, 1922 (aged 64); Bronxville, New York
- Occupations: Author; editor; lawyer
- Writing career
- Period: 1887–1922

Tudor Storrs Jenks (May 7, 1857 – February 11, 1922) was an American writer, poet, artist and editor, as well as a journalist and lawyer. He is chiefly remembered for the popular works of fiction and nonfiction he wrote for children and general readers.

== Life and family ==
Jenks was born on May 7, 1857, in Brooklyn, New York, the son of Grenville Tudor Jenks and Persis Sophia (Smith) Jenks. His older brother was Almet F. Jenks, presiding justice of the appellate division of the New York Supreme Court. His younger brother Paul E. Jenks served as American vice consul in Yokohama, Japan. He was a grand-nephew of Wendell Phillips. He married, October 5, 1882, Mary Donnison Ford. They had three daughters, Dorothy, Pauline, and Amabel, the last of whom Jenks collaborated with on a play. He lived in Bronxville, New York, where he died at his home, of apoplexy, on February 11, 1922. He was survived by his wife and daughters.

== Education ==
Jenks graduated from Brooklyn Polytechnic Institute in 1874, Yale University in 1878, and Columbia Law School in 1880. He studied art in Paris in the winter of 1880–1881. Among his classmates at Yale were William Howard Taft, afterwards president of the United States, and Arthur Twining Hadley, later president of the university. During his attendance there he became a member of Skull and Bones and Delta Kappa Epsilon.

== Career ==
Jenks practiced law in New York City from 1881 to 1887, following which he served on the staff of St. Nicholas Magazine as an associate editor from November 1887 – October 1902. Afterwards he resumed law practice with the firm of Jenks & Rogers, of which his brother Almet was the senior partner. He was also a professional writer throughout his working life. His shorter works appeared in numerous magazines, including The American Magazine, Art World and Arts and Decoration, Book Buyer, The Bookman, The Century, Chautauquan, The Critic, Current Opinion, The Era, Everybody's Magazine, Good Housekeeping, Harper's Bazaar, Harper's Monthly Magazine, Harper's New Monthly Magazine, Harper's Weekly, International Studio, Journal of Education, Ladies' Home Journal, Lippincott's Monthly Magazine, Living Age, Munsey's Magazine, Outing, St. Nicholas, The Cosmopolitan, The Independent, The Outlook, Woman's Home Companion, and World's Work. They were extensively anthologized during his own time. His books, almost all of them juveniles, were published by the Henry Altemus Company, A. S. Barnes & Company, Thomas Y. Crowell & Company, Doubleday, and F.A. Stokes Co., among others. Several were illustrated by John R. Neill. Jenks was a member of the Authors' Club.

== Bibliography ==
=== Juvenile fiction ===
- The Century World's fair book for boys and girls; being the adventures of Harry and Philip with their tutor, Mr. Douglass, at the World's Columbian Exposition (1893) (Internet Archive e-text)
- Imaginotions; Truthless Tales (1894) (Google e-text) (Internet Archive e-text)
- Galopoff, the Talking Pony; a story for young folks (1901)
- Gypsy the Talking Dog; a story for young folks (1902)
- The Defense of the Castle, a story of the siege of an English castle in the thirteenth century (1903) (Google e-text) (Internet Archive e-text)
- Making a Start (1903)
- A Little Rough Rider (1904)
- The Doll That Talked (1906)
- The Astrologer's Niece (1973)

==== Magic Wand series ====
- The Magic Wand (1905) (Internet Archive e-text)
- Romero and Julietta (1905)
- A Magician for One Day (1905) (Google e-text)
- The Prince and the Dragons (1905)
- Timothy's Magical Afternoon (1905) (Google e-text)
- The Rescue Syndicate (1905)

==== What Shall I Be? series ====
- The Fireman (1911)
- The Sailor (1911)

=== Short stories ===
- "Prehistoric Photography"
- "The Tongaloo Tournament"
- "The Dragon's Story"
- "A Duel in a Desert"
- "The Sequel"
- "A Lost Opportunity" (1894)
- "The Astrologer's Niece"
- "The Astrologer's Niece Marries"
- "The Winning of Vanella"
- "The Professor and the Patagonian Giant"
- "The Prince's Councilors"
- "Teddy and the Wolf"
- "Little Plunkett's Cousin"
- "Professor Chipmunk's Surprising Adventure"
- "The Satchel"
- "Good Neighbors"
- "Anthony and the Ancients"
- "A Yarn of Sailor Ben's"
- "The Statue"
- "The Department of Athletics" (1894)
- "A Literary Conversation" (1898)
- "A Novel Ruined" (1899)
- "A Supernatural Swindle" (1899)
- "At the Door" (1899)
- "The Umbrella of Justice" (1901)
- "The Detective and the Ring" (1905)
- "The Master Passion" (1905)
- "A Concrete Example" (1905)
- "Why Duillius Dined at Home" (1909)
- "A Practical Problem" (1921)

=== Drama ===
- "Quits: a Dialogue Farce in Two Scenes" (1893)
- "Abbie's Accounts: a Monologue" (1897)
- "The Baron's Victim: A Mellow Drama" (with Duffield Osborne) (1898)
- "Diplomatic Reserve: a Dialogue" (1898)
- "Parried" (1899)
- "At the Door: a Little Comedy" (1899)
- "Waiting for the Ring: a Monologue" (1902)
- "The Lady and the Telephone" (1904)
- Dinner at Seven Sharp; a comedy in one act (1917) (with Amabel Jenks) (Google e-text)

=== Poetry ===
- "Bric-a-Brac" (1888)
- "A Thank-ye-Ma'am (To J.W.R.)" (1889)
- "A Reader's Choice" (1890)
- "How Curious! Said One Little Girl to Another Little Girl" (1894)
- "An Accommodating Lion" (ca 1894)
- "A Christmas Song" (1895)
- "Little Miss Pigeon" (1897)
- "Punishment" (1897)
- "Tidy Housekeeper" (1897)
- "New Neighbor" (1898)
- "King and Minstrel" (1899)
- "Immortality" (1899)
- "A Prayer" (1899)
- "Two Valentines" (1900)
- "Boast Fulfilled" (1900)
- "On the Road" (1900)
- "Pleased Customer" (1901)
- "At Cupid's Counter" (1901)
- "Interchange" (1901)
- "Queen's Messenger" (1902)
- "New Sentry and the Little Boy" (1902)
- "A Merry-Go-Round" (1903)
- "Little Elfin Nurse" (1903)
- "Baby's Name" (1903)
- "A Creed" (1903)
- "The Battlefield" (1904)
- "A Feat of Memory" (1904)
- "Eternal Feminine" (1904)
- "Three Lessons" (1905)
- "June" (1905)
- "Pastoral" (1905)
- "The Very Earliest" (1905)
- "Three Lessons" (1905)
- "Waiting for the Train" (1905)
- "Stop Thief!" (1906)
- "Sold" (1906)
- "N. E. W. S." (1906)
- "Old Mammy Tipsytoes" (1906)
- "Change of View" (1906)
- "Modern Boy" (1906)
- "Demon of Notre Dame" (1907)
- "For Spellers" (1908)
- "How We Say It" (1908)
- "Months and the Jewels" (1909)
- "The Rime of the Moderne Millionaire" (1909)
- "Rien du Tout" (1910)
- "Words Without Songs" (1910)
- "Lucky Man" (1911)
- "The Portrait and the Artist" (1912)
- "Brave Little Girl" (1914)
- "Little Supposing" (1914)
- "After School" (1915)
- "Portrait by Velasquez" (1916)
- "Here's How!" (1916)
- "Short Flight" (1916)
- "In Italy" (1917)
- "Way to the Fairies" (1917)
- "A Timely Petition" (1917)
- "The Song of the Collar-Button" (1917)
- "Aquarellist Vision" (1918)
- "Fairyland Fashions" (1919)
- "A Summing Up" (1919)
- "Words Without Songs" (1910)
- "Small and Early"
- "The Spirit of the Maine"
- "In a Library"
- "An Old Bachelor"

=== Nonfiction ===
==== Biography ====
===== Lives of Great Writers =====
- In the Days of Chaucer (1904) (Google e-text) (Internet Archive e-text)
- In the Days of Shakespeare (1904) (Google e-text) (Internet Archive e-text)
- In the Days of Milton (1905) (Google e-text)
- In the Days of Scott (1906) (Google e-text)
- In the Days of Goldsmith (1907) (Google e-text)
- In the Days of Bacon (1908)

===== Other =====
- Captain John Smith (1904) (Internet Archive e-text)
- Captain Miles Standish (1905) (Google e-text)

==== History ====
- The Book of Famous Sieges (1909) (Google e-text) (Internet Archive e-text)
- The Boys' Book of Explorations; true stories of the heroes of travel and discovery in Africa, Asia, Australia and the Americas. From the "Dark Ages" to the "wonderful century" (1900) (Internet Archive e-text)
- Our army for our boys; a brief story of its organization, development and equipment from 1775 to the present day (1906)
- When America Was New (1907) (Internet Archive e-text)
- When America Won Liberty: Patriots and Royalists (1909) (Google e-text)
- When America Became a Nation (1910)

==== Science ====
- Electricity for Young People (1907) (Google e-text)
- Photography for Young People (1908) (Google e-text)
- Chemistry for Young People (1909; AKA Chemistry for Beginners (1910)) (Google e-text) (Internet Archive e-text)

==== Short works ====
- "The Essay" (1893)
- "Scraps" (1894)
- "A Miniature Reference Library" (1894)
- "Intercivic Humor" (1899)
- "A Brief for the Philistine" (1906)
- "The Best Books for Children" (1901)
- "Can the Jury System Be Improved?" (1903)
- "The 'American' Characteristics" (1905)

=== Edited ===
- Tales of Fantasy (vol. IV of Young Folks' Library) (1902) (Google e-text) (Internet Archive e-text)
