= Henry Shute =

American novelist

Henry Augustus Shute (1856–1943) was an American lawyer, judge and writer, who was best known for his "Plupy" stories in The Saturday Evening Post and a series of books.

== Biography ==
Henry A. Shute was an American author best known for his humorous stories of small-town New England life, particularly his series of Plupy books inspired by his boyhood in Exeter, New Hampshire.

Born in Exeter, Shute graduated from Phillips Exeter Academy in 1875 and Harvard University in 1879. In the 1890s, the Exeter News-Letter began publishing a weekly column of his recollections of boyhood in Exeter. Shute later self-published these sketches under the titles Several Hard Characters (1898) and Neighborhood Sketches (1901).

His third book, The Real Diary of a Real Boy (1902), brought him national recognition and established his reputation as a humorist. Over the course of his career he wrote 20 books, among them Brite and Fair (1920). Between 1925 and 1928, his stories appeared widely in The Saturday Evening Post, often accompanied by illustrations from Leslie Turner.

Shute's other works include:

- Sequil to the Real Diary (1904)
- Real Boys (1905)
- Letters to Beany (1905)
- A Few Neighbors (1906)
- A Profane and Somewhat Unreliable History of Exeter (1907)
- The Country Band (1909)
- A Country Lawyer (1909)
- Farming It (1909)
- Plupy the Real Boy (1911)
- The Misadventures of Three Good Boys (1914)
- The Youth Plupy or the Lad with the Downy Chin (1917)
- The Real Diary of the Worst Farmer (1920)
- Plupy and Old J. Albert (1924)
- Plupy, Beany and Pewt, Contractors (1926)
- Chadwick & Shute, Gob Printers (1927)
- Plupy, The Wirst Yet (1929)
