= Davy and the Goblin =

1885 book by Charles E. Carryl

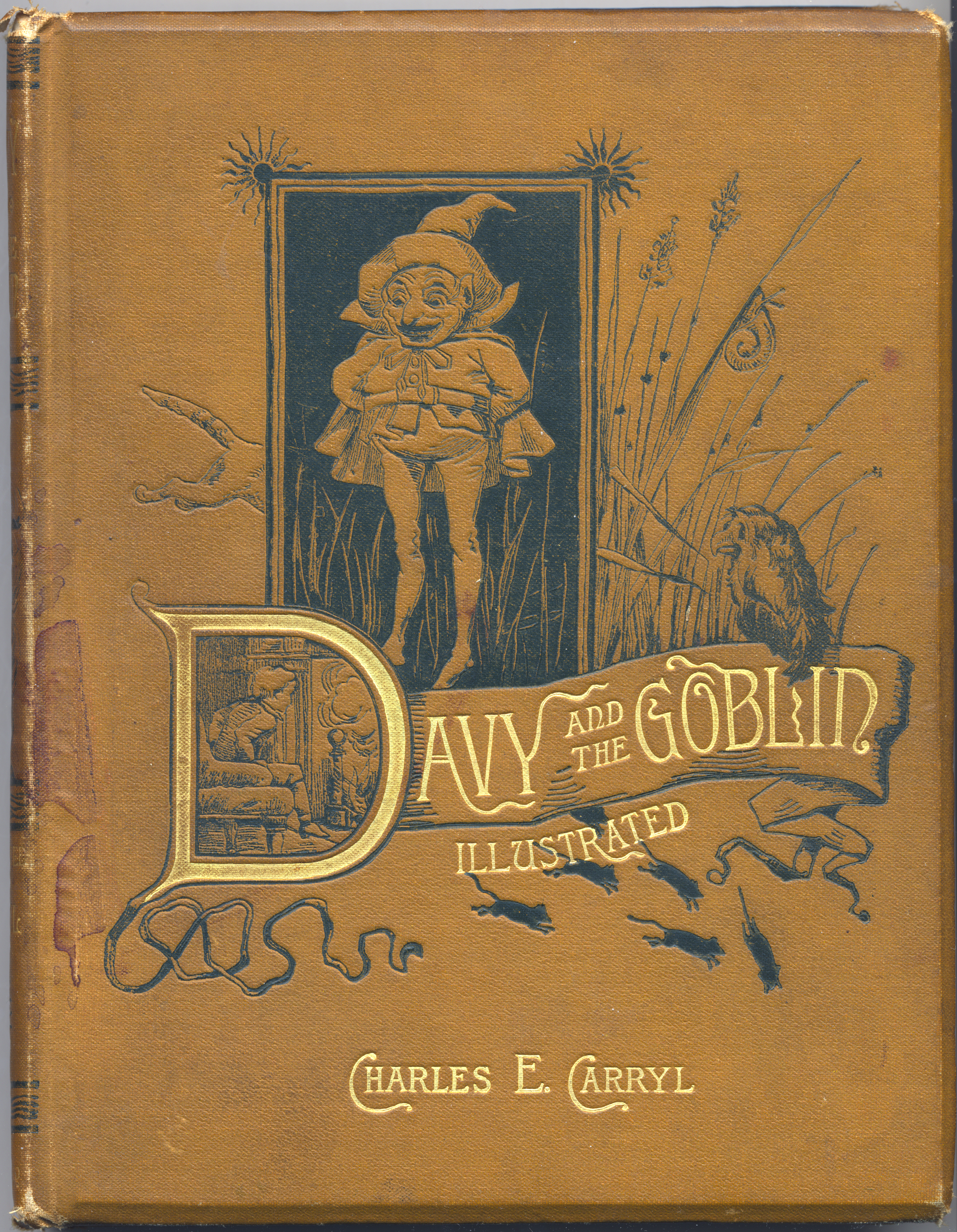
- First edition cover of Davy and the Goblin
- Author: Charles E. Carryl
- Language: English
- Genre: Fantasy novel
- Publisher: Houghton Mifflin
- Publication date: 1885
- Publication place: United States
- Media type: Print (Hardback)
- Pages: 164

Davy and the Goblin, or, What Followed Reading "Alice's Adventures in Wonderland" is a novel by Charles E. Carryl that was serialized in St. Nicholas magazine from December 1884 to March 1885 before being published by Houghton Mifflin of Boston and Frederick Warne of London in 1885. It was one of the first "imitations" inspired by Lewis Carroll's two books, Alice's Adventures in Wonderland (1865) and Through the Looking-Glass (1871).

The story is about eight-year-old Davy who reads Lewis Carroll's novel Alice's Adventures in Wonderland next to the fireplace, when he begins to get sleepy. A goblin appears in the fire, munching coals, and takes Davy on a "believing voyage" where he meets a variety of characters from fantasy and literature.

The book features line drawings by Edmund Birckhead Bensell.

In 1891, Carryl wrote another book inspired by Alice's Adventures in Wonderland, called The Admiral's Caravan.

== Bibliography ==
- Carryl, Charles Edward (2011) Davy and the Goblin. Evertype. ISBN 978-1-904808-65-7
