= Charles E. Carryl =

American writer

- Born: December 30, 1841; New York
- Died: July 3, 1920 (aged 78)

Charles Edward Carryl (December 30, 1841 – July 3, 1920) was an American children's literature author.

== Biography ==
Born in New York, Carryl became a second-generation successful businessman; and a stockbroker, who for 34 years starting in 1874 held a seat on the New York Stock Exchange. In 1869 he married Mary Wetmore. Their elder child was the poet and humorist Guy Wetmore Carryl. In 1882 Charles E. Carryl published his first work: Stock Exchange Primer.

In 1884 he published the children's fantasy Davy and the Goblin; or, What Followed Reading "Alice's Adventures in Wonderland", serialized in the magazine St Nicholas. His work includes the children's nonsense poem “The Walloping Window Blind”, published in 1885, in a verse style similar to Lewis Carroll’s: A capital ship for an ocean trip/Was the Walloping Window-Blind;/No wind that blew dismayed her crew/Or troubled the captain’s mind. A second novel, The Admiral's Caravan, also serialized in St Nicholas beginning in December 1891, was dedicated to his daughter Constance.

== Adaptations ==
His poem "The Walloping Window Blind" can be sung to the same tune as Ten Thousand Miles Away, using the same refrain (or with minor changes). It has been variously named "Capital Ship", "Blow, Ye Winds, Heigh-Ho", and "The Walloping Window-Blind". It was called "Capital Ship" by Bounding Main on their 2005 album Lost at Sea.

His poems "The Sleepy Giant" and "The Walloping Window Blind" are featured on Natalie Merchant's 2010 concept album Leave Your Sleep.
