= Japanese youth culture =

Japanese society hosts a number of popular youth cultures. Fashion subcultures among children and teenagers have included visual kei and Gothic Lolita; more recent subcultures are Japanese idol, Nagoya kei, and gyaru.

== History ==
A distinct youth culture began in the mid-1980s with the style visual kei, with bands such as D'erlanger, X Japan and Buck-Tick. In the 1990s the idol movement began with idol group Morning Musume. Other cultures for youth was Nagoya kei and Gothic Lolita. The youth culture in Japan began in the 1980s with cultures such as Japanese idol and visual kei. Japanese idol groups such as Cute, Morning Musume and Arashi began in the youth fans and teen fans. Visual kei bands such as An Cafe, Ayabie and Lynch. began with more fans of youth and teen and girl groups AKB48 and Berryz Kobo sing at more concerts in Asia, USA and Europe.

The gyaru began in the 2000s as youth culture and gyaru began in the song "Watchin' Girl" from alternative rock band Shonen Knife.

Gothic Lolita began as youth culture in the 1990s and in the 2000s, with Japanese visual kei rock musician Mana from visual kei bands Malice Mizer and Moi dix Mois.

== Youth cultures ==
- Visual kei
- Nagoya kei, a subgenre of visual kei
- Japanese idol
- Gothic Lolita
- Gyaru
- Gyaru-oh
- Para Para
- Cosplay
- Otaku
- Jendāresu
- Manga
