= Ida Waugh =

American illustrator

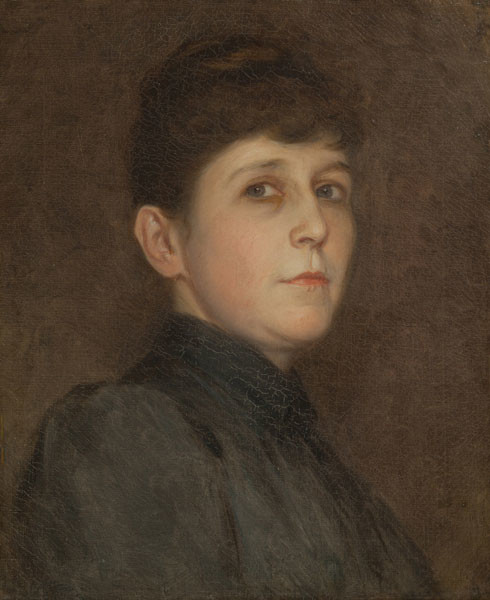
- Self-portrait
- Born: October 24, 1846; Philadelphia, Pennsylvania
- Died: January 25, 1919 (aged 72); Philadelphia, Pennsylvania
- Known for: Illustration
- Partner: Amy Ella Blanchard

Ida Waugh (October 24, 1846 – January 25, 1919) was an American illustrator of children's literature who often collaborated with her lifelong companion, Amy Ella Blanchard.

== Personal life ==
Ida Waugh was born in Philadelphia, Pennsylvania on October 24, 1846, the daughter of painter Samuel B. Waugh and his first wife, Sarah Mendenhall, therefore she was half-sister of painter Frederick Judd Waugh. Her step-mother was Mary Eliza Young Waugh, a miniaturist.

She attended Académie Julian and Académie Delécluse in Paris, studying with Georges Callot, Paul-Louis Delance, and Jean-Joseph Benjamin-Constant. In 1868 she attended the first "Ladies Life Class" at Pennsylvania Academy of the Fine Arts; in the same class there were Emily Sartain and Catherine Ann Drinker.

== Career ==
Ida Waugh collaborated with her partner Amy Ella Blanchard in publishing children's books, Waugh as illustrator and Blanchard as writer. Waugh also published books on her own.

Other than a children's book illustrator, Waugh was an award-winning painter. In 1869 she exhibited at the Pennsylvania Academy of the Fine Arts two works, "The Bargain" and a portrait bust of Carl Gaertner.

Her self-portrait and another painting, "Little Cosette" (1870), are in the permanent collection of the Woodmere Art Museum, Philadelphia, both donated by Mrs. John S. Haug in 1961. They were part of the exhibition "Women and Biography" in 2014, including: Elizabeth Shippen Green, Violet Oakley, Edith Emerson, Anne Minich, Catherine Mulligan, Mitzi Melnicoff, Alice Kent Stoddard, Aubrey Levinthal, Martha Armstrong, Mickayel Thurin, Edith Neff, Barbara Bullock, Gertrude Fisher-Fishman, Mary Cassatt, Millicent Krouse, Betty W. Hubbard, Helen Corson Hovenden. Blanchard was the great-aunt of Mrs. John S. Haug.

Rev J. Henry Smythe Jr., a University of Pennsylvania graduate who gained fame in 1904 at a Chicago convention by using a megaphone to ask for an ovation to President Theodore Roosevelt was one of the babies portrayed in the series by Ida Waugh, "Sunshine Babies" (1887); the firm A.D. Matthews' Sons reprinted them in 1907 with the help of the same Smythe to retrieve the original lithographs.

In the 1880s she painted the portrait of Florence Sellers Coxe Paul. Her most well-known work, Hagar and Ishmael was exhibited at the French Salon in 1888, and was then bought by the Pennsylvania Academy of Fine Arts. In 1890 she published Ideal Heads, a 21-page book with black-and-white illustrations by various artists, including the first illustration published by Jessie Willcox Smith. In 1893 she exhibited at the World's Columbian Exposition in Chicago: "Pierrot", "Two Babies", and "All in Four Seconds" were exhibited in the Rotunda, Woman's Building, and "Hagar and Ishmael" was exhibited in the Palace of Fine Arts.

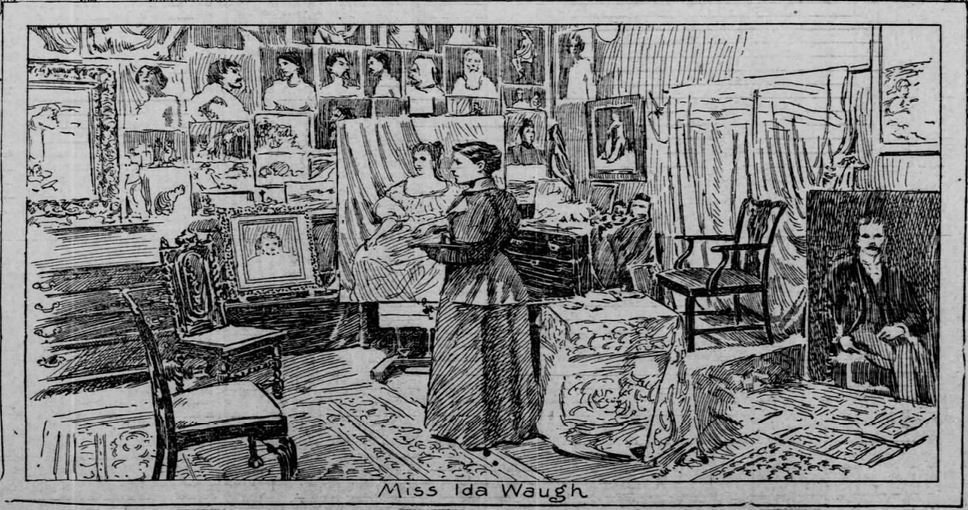
Ida Waugh in her studio, 1895 (publ. The Philadelphia Inquirer)

In 1895 she was featured, with other women painters, in an article in The Philadelphia Inquirer, "Prominent Women Artists in Their Cozy Studios"; the article highlighted how Waugh's studio walls were "papered with numerous sketches... the majority of them being head and figure poses, as this artist, as is well known, makes a specialty of portrait painting". In 1896 the studio, at 1530 Chestnut Street, was damaged by water due to a fire that destroyed the studio next to hers, belonging to Carol Beck.

In 1896 the portrait of Dr. Paul J. Sartain won the Norman W. Dodge prize at the National Academy of Design and was exhibited in 1901 at the Pan-American Exposition. She exhibited in Philadelphia, Cincinnati, Chicago and New York.

Waugh's illustrations from When Mother Was a Little Girl were made into chromolithographic postcards. She worked for McLoughlin Brothers, a New York publishing firm.

== Later personal life ==
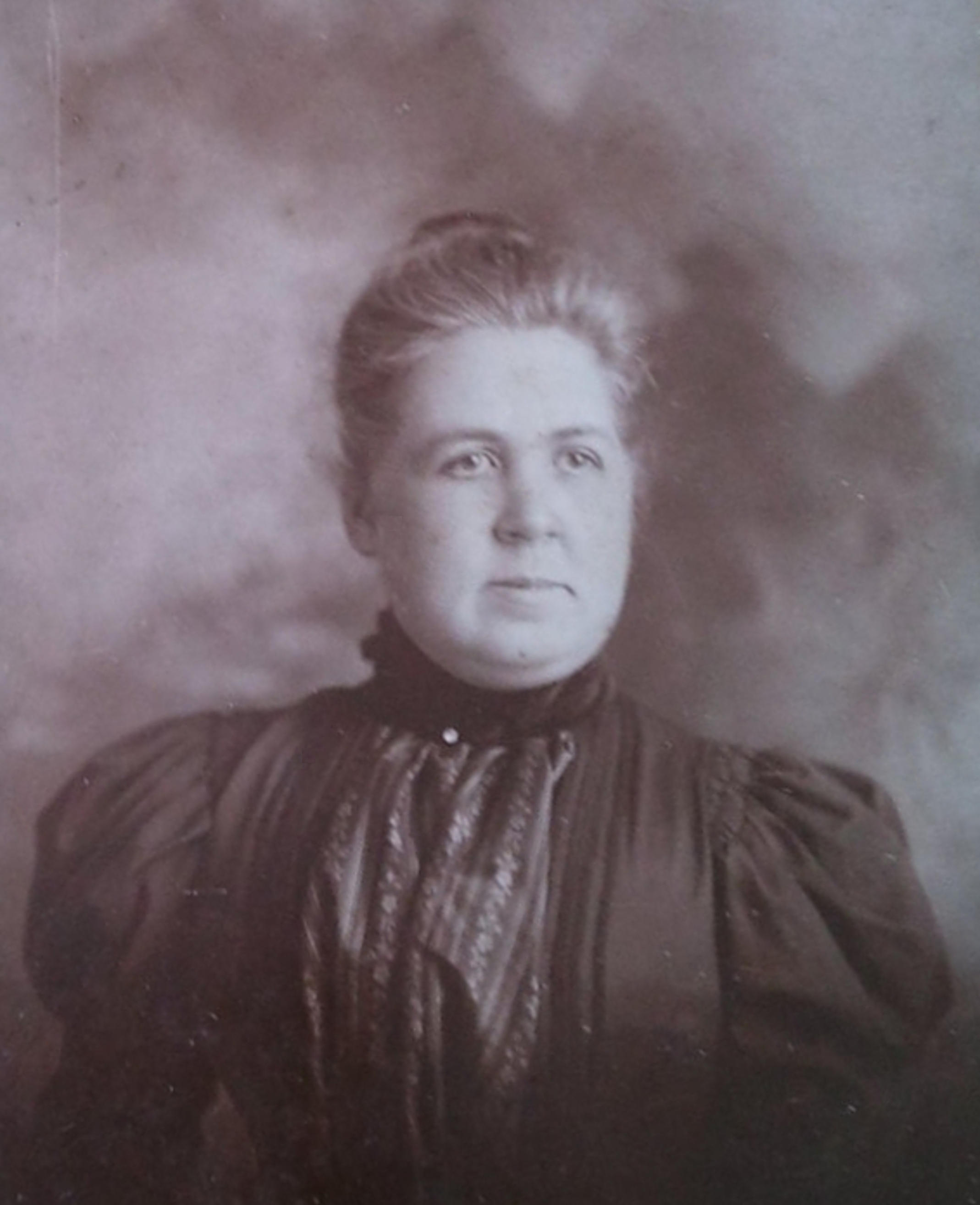
Amy Ella Blanchard, 1900

Ida Waugh was the lifelong companion of Amy Ella Blanchard (1856–1926), writer of children's literature. They met when Waugh was still living with her parents and Blanchard was hired as tutor of Waugh's younger brother, future painter Frederick Waugh. They remained together until Ida's death in 1919.

Waugh and Blanchard owned adjacent summer cottages on Bailey Island (Maine). Together they organized the founding of a summer chapel there for the Episcopal church. The chapel was completed in 1916.

Ida Waugh died on January 25, 1919, at her home in New York City, at 245 East 19th Street, and is buried next to her father at The Woodlands (Philadelphia).

== Works ==
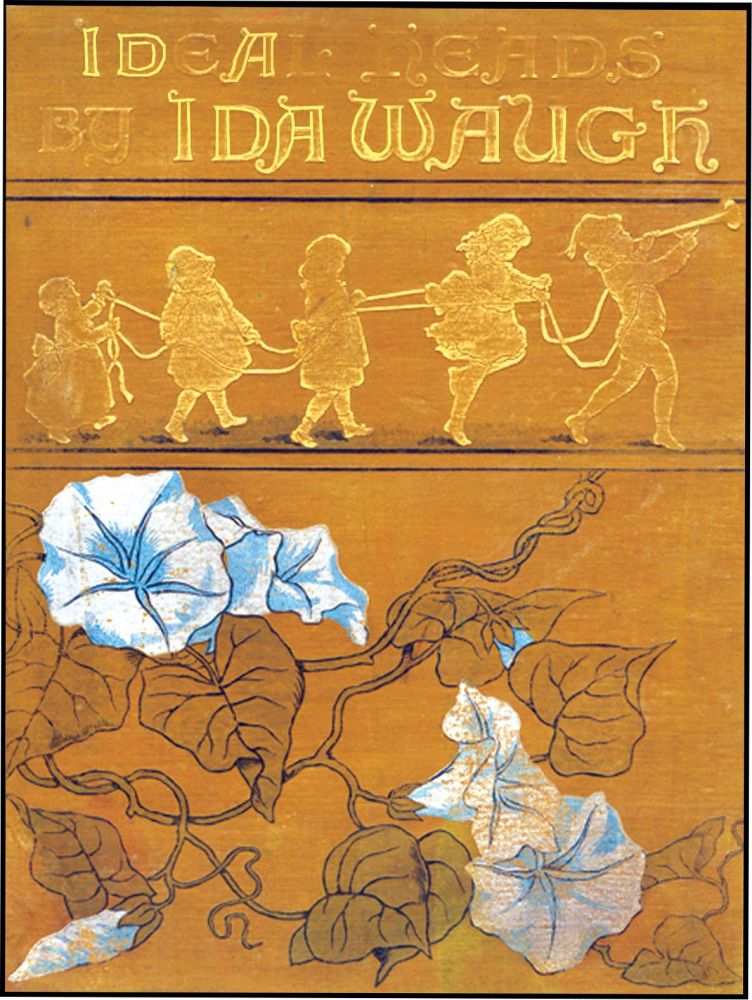
Ideal Heads by Ida Waugh

- Alphabet Book: For Little Ones Who, If They Look, Will Find their Letters in This Book (1888), verses by Amy Ella Blanchard
- Becky Longnose and other stories (1882)
- Belle's pink boots, by Joanna H. Mathews
- Bless it (1890), by Amy Ella Blanchard
- Bonny Bairns (1891), 48 large quarto pages with poems by Amy Ella Blanchard
- The butterfly (1890), by Amy Ella Blanchard
- A Daughter of the Forest (1903), by Evelyn Raymond
- Dimple Dallas: the further fortunes of a sweet little maid (1900), by Amy Ella Blanchard
- Dorothy Day (1898), by Julie M. Lippmann
- Earning Her Way to College, by Mrs Clarke Johnson
- The Ferry Maid of the Chattahoochee, by Annie M. Barnes
- The Garden fence and other stories (1882)
- The Girl Ranchers, by Carrie L. Marshall
- Her Father's Legacy (1901), by Helen Sherman Griffith
- His Lordship's Puppy, by Theodora C. Elmslie
- Holly berries (1881), by Amy Ella Blanchard
- Little chicks and baby tricks (ca. 1885)
- Little Polly Prentiss (1903), by Elizabeth Lincoln Gould
- A Maid at King Alfred's Court: A Story for Girls (1900), by Lucy Foster Madison
- A maid of the first century: a story for girls (1899), by Lucy Foster Madison
- Mammy's baby (ca. 1890), by Amy Ella Blanchard
- The Minstrel boy and other stories (ca. 1882)
- Miss Wildfire (1897), by Julie M. Lippmann
- Mistress May (ca. 1901), by Amy Ella Blanchard
- My Lady Barefoot (1899), by Evelyn Raymond
- My own dolly (1883), by Amy Ella Blanchard
- An Odd Little Lass (1898), by Jessie E. Wright
- Our boys (ca. 1880)
- Over the hills (1882)
- The proud little lady and other stories (1880)
- A sweet little maid (1899), by Amy Ella Blanchard
- Sweet P's (1903), by Julie Mathilde Lippmann
- Tangles & curls, or, Little boys and little girls (1888), by Amy Ella Blanchard
- Tell me a story (1888), by Amy Ella Blanchard
- Twenty little maidens (1894), by Amy Ella Blanchard
- Two Wyoming Girls and Their Homestead Claim: A Story for Girls (1899), by Carrie L. Marshall
- Uncle Tom the Burglar (1901), by Mabel E. Wotton
- The Walcott Twins, by Lucille Lovell
- Wee babies (1883), verse by Amy Ella Blanchard
- Wee tots (1891), 48 original designs with poems by Amy Ella Blanchard
- A Yankee Girl in Old California (1901), by Evelyn Raymond
Works by Ida Waugh

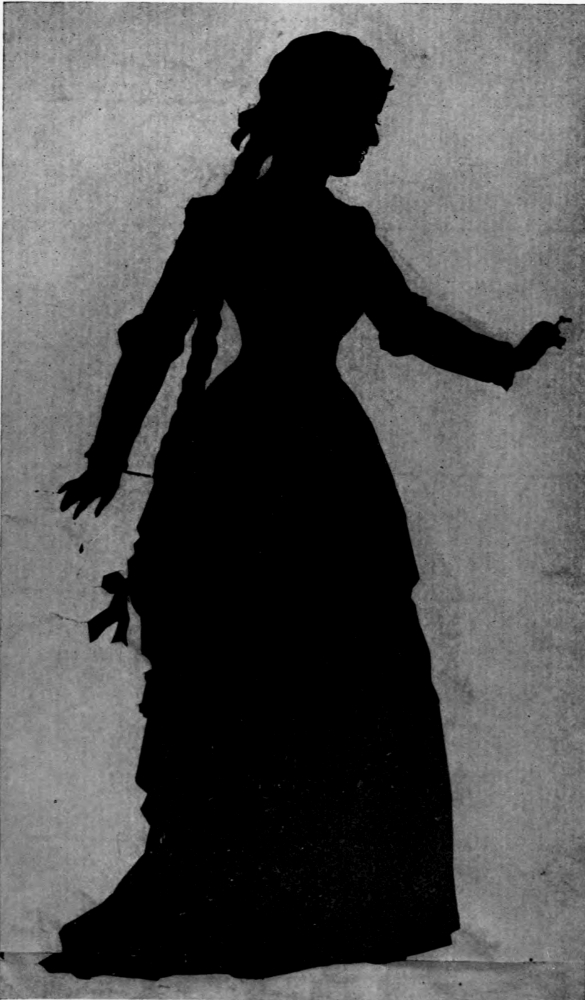
Clara Louise Kellogg as Marguerite, 1864, From a silhouette by Ida Waugh

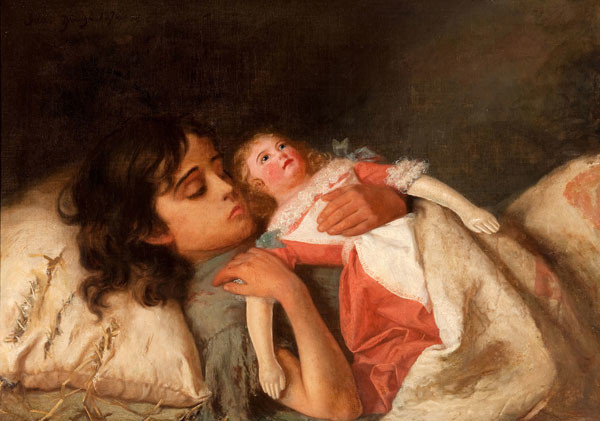
Ida Waugh, Little Cosette, 1870

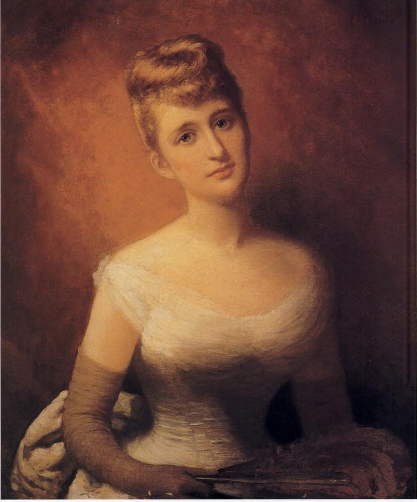
Florence Sellers Coxe Paul (the daughter of David Wampole Sellers) by Ida Waugh (circa 1880)
