= Statue of Maria Sanford =

Statue in the United States Capitol

Maria Sanford
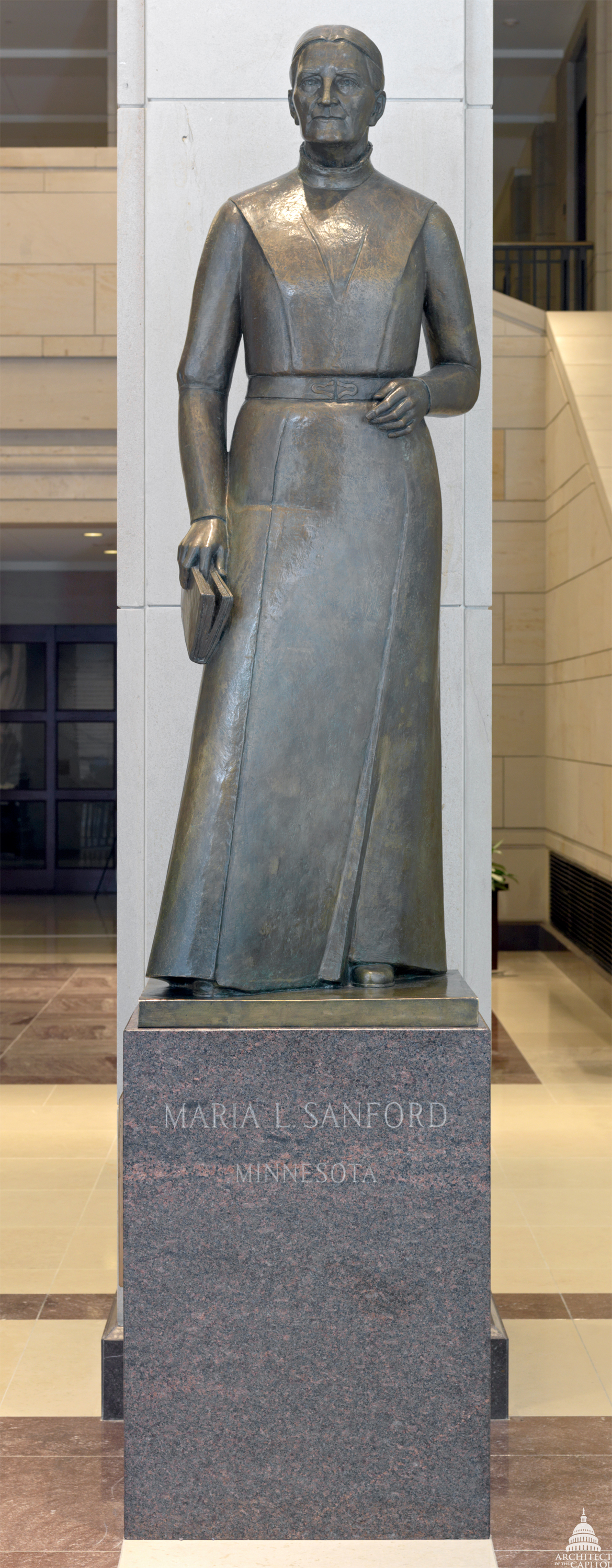
- The statue in Emancipation Hall, 2011
- Artist: Evelyn Raymond
- Medium: Bronze sculpture
- Subject: Maria Sanford
- Location: Washington, D.C., United States

Maria Sanford is a bronze sculpture of the American educator of the same name by Evelyn Raymond, installed in the United States Capitol Visitor Center's Emancipation Hall, in Washington, D.C., as part of the National Statuary Hall Collection. The statue was gifted by the U.S. state of Minnesota in 1958.

== See also ==
- 1958 in art
