= Samuel Waugh =

American painter

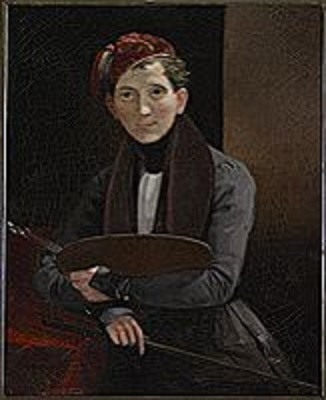
Self-portrait

Samuel Bell Waugh ( 1814 in New Wilmington, Pennsylvania – 28 September, 1885, in Janesville, Wisconsin) was a 19th-century American portrait, landscape, and moving panorama painter. His portrait subjects included Presidents Abraham Lincoln and Ulysses S. Grant.

== Biography ==
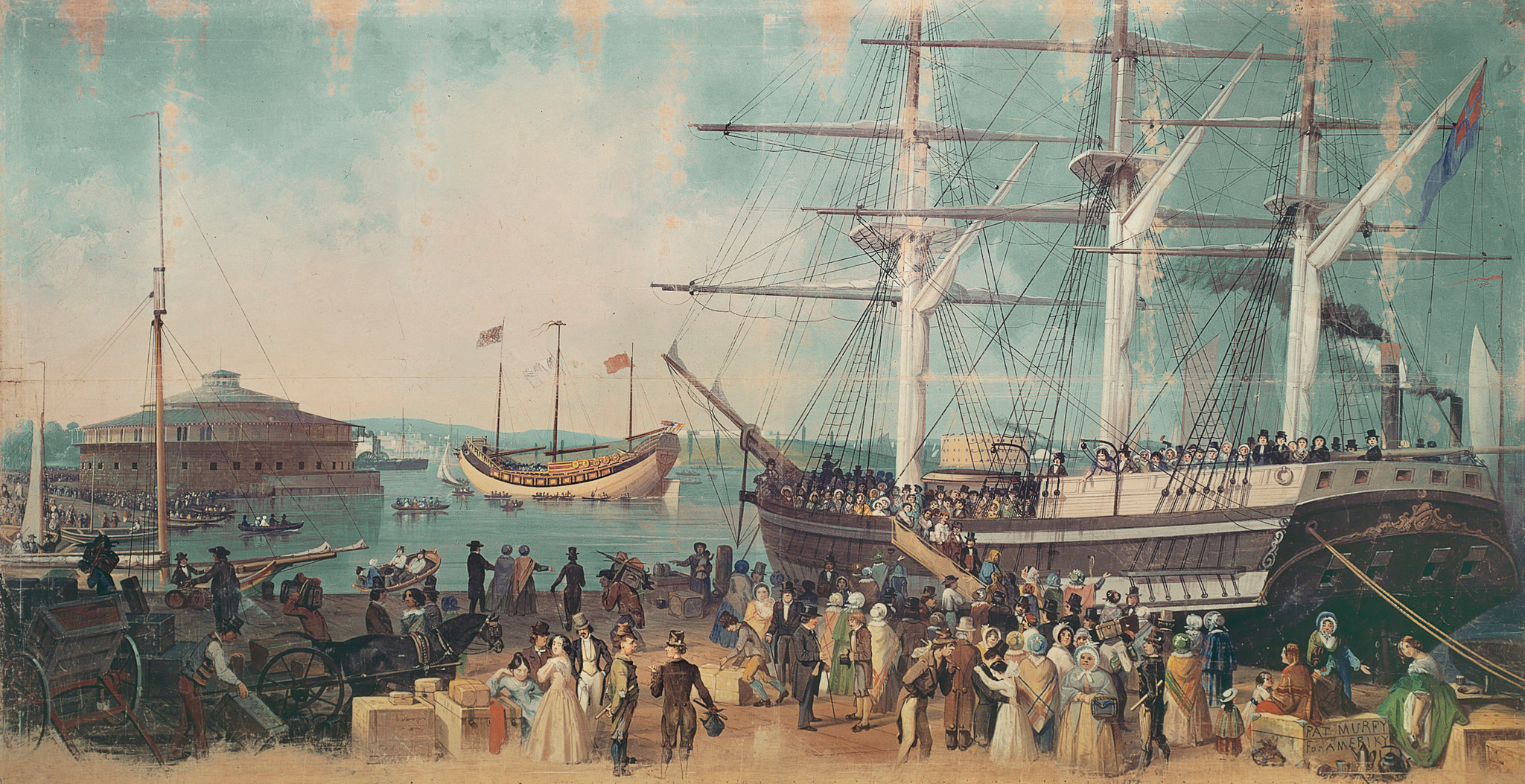
"The Bay and Harbor of New York" by Samuel Waugh (c. 1814-1885), depicting the Junk Keying in New York harbour in July 1847 (watercolor on canvas, c.1853-1855, Museum of the City of New York).

He was born in about 1814 in New Wilmington, Pennsylvania, then part of the Mercer County, Pennsylvania. According to some reports, his father, James Waugh, was a pioneer-settler in New Wilmington where he ran the first general store. Little is known about Samuel's early life and education. It was suggested that he worked in a paint shop in Pittsburgh and also took painting lessons from J. R. Smith, who advertised himself as the "Scenic Artist of the Pittsburgh Theater". He joined his brother John in Toronto in 1833. In 1834, he displayed his paintings at the exhibition of the Society of Artists and Amateurs of Toronto where they were judged "among the very best portraits." In Toronto, he became a friend of already established American painter also hailing from Mercer County, James Bowman. They both started to plan a trip to Rome, Italy, but Bowman changed his mind and instead decided to settle in Detroit, and Waugh remained in Canada relocating to Montreal. He went to Italy in late 1836 or early 1837 staying in Rome and Naples until 1841 or 1842. His portrait of the Danish sculptor Bertel Thorvaldsen (1838) buttressed his reputation as an accomplished artist and eased his transition to Philadelphia where he established himself as a leading portrait and landscape painter. Sculptor Thomas Crawford and painter James Edward Freeman might have aided him in this process.

In 1849, Waugh debuted in Philadelphia his first Italian moving panorama, Mirror of Italy, or Grand Tour through Italy, which was based on his Italian sketches; it became a success and toured different American cities for six years. His second panorama, Italia, depicting a voyage from Boston to Italy, opened in 1854.

On 28 September 1885, Waugh died while visiting his sister in Janesville, Wisconsin. In a eulogy, the National Academy characterized Waugh as one of its "earlier and highly respected members."

== Family ==
His daughter from first marriage to Sarah Lendenhall, Ida Waugh (1846-1919), was an award-winning figure painter, and her portrait of Dr. Paul J. Sartain received the 1896 Norman W. Dodge prize at the National Academy; she also illustrated children's books written by her step-brother's tutor Amy Ella Blanchard. His second wife, Mary Eliza Young Waugh, was a miniature painter. Their son Frederick Judd Waugh (1861–1940), born in Bordentown, New Jersey, is best remembered as a marine painter. His grandson, Frederick Coulton Waugh, was also an artist, known for his work on the comic strip Dickie Dare. His nephew, Henry W. Waugh (1835-1865), was an actor and scene and landscape painter. The Waughs owned a house in Bordentown, New Jersey overlooking the Delaware River where they spent many summers.

== Recognition ==
Waugh was one of the leading portrait painters in Philadelphia during his lifetime and was known nationally for his Italian moving panoramas. Waugh exhibited frequently at the Pennsylvania Academy of Fine Arts and the Artists' Fund Society of Philadelphia, the National Academy of Design in New York, and the Boston Aethenaeum. His traveling panoramas, Mirror of Italy, or Grand Tour through Italy and Italia, were well received by American public. In 1847, he became an honorary member of the National Academy of Design and Toronto Society of Arts.

== Gallery ==
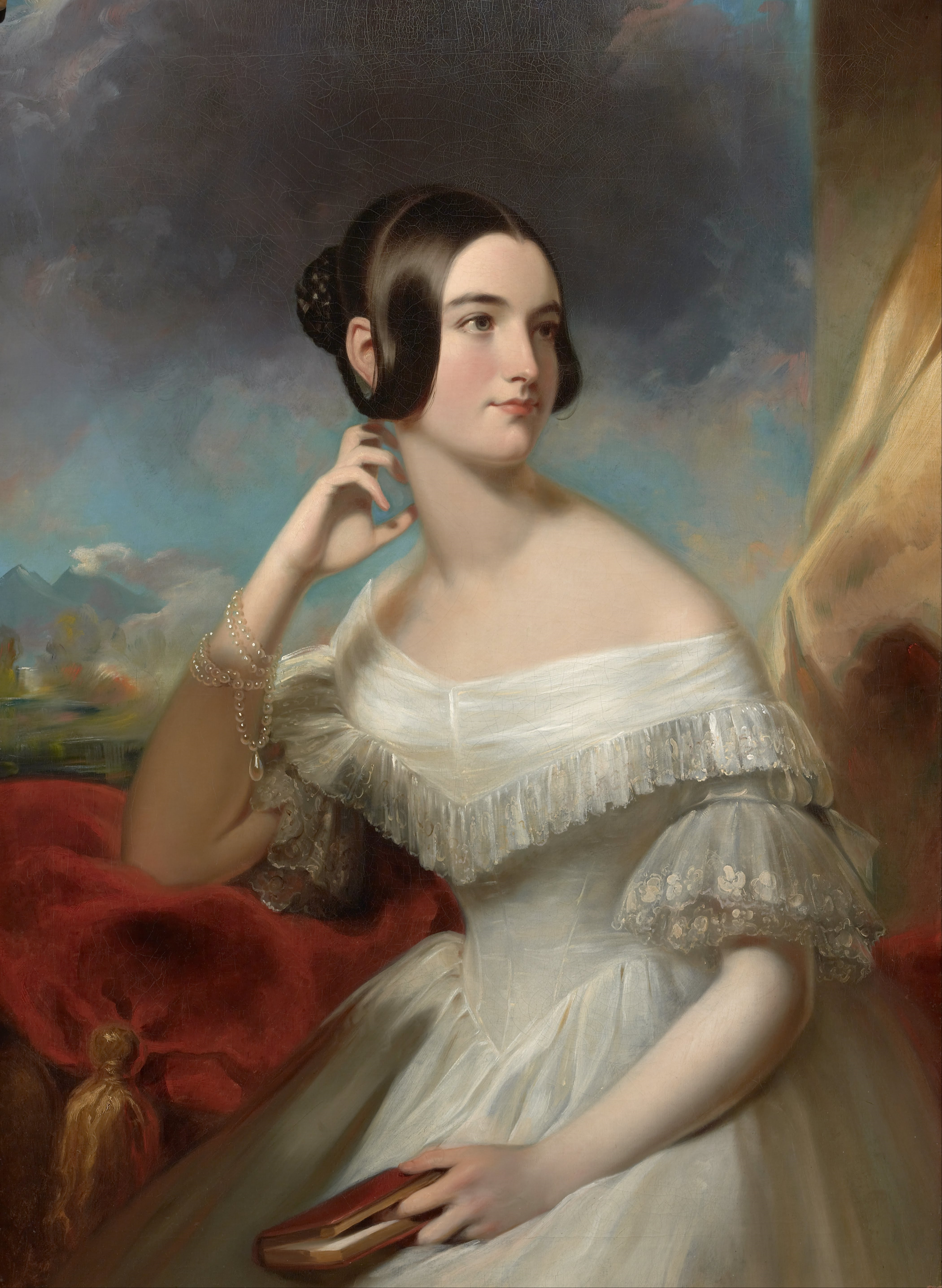
Portrait of Miss Jane Mercer

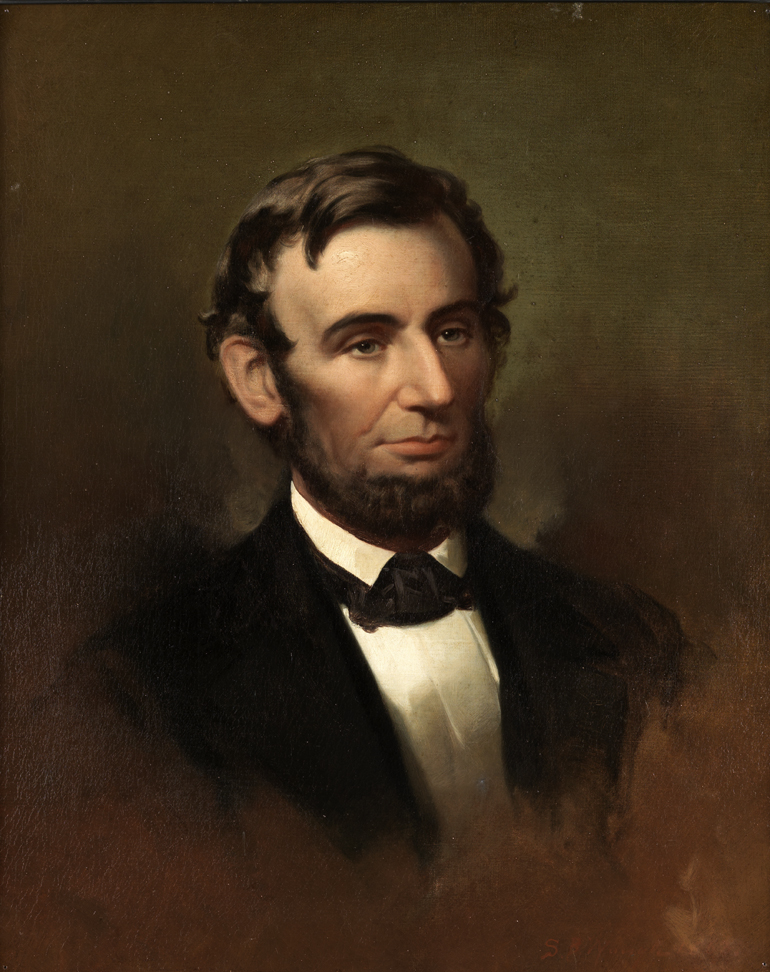
Portrait of Abraham Lincoln

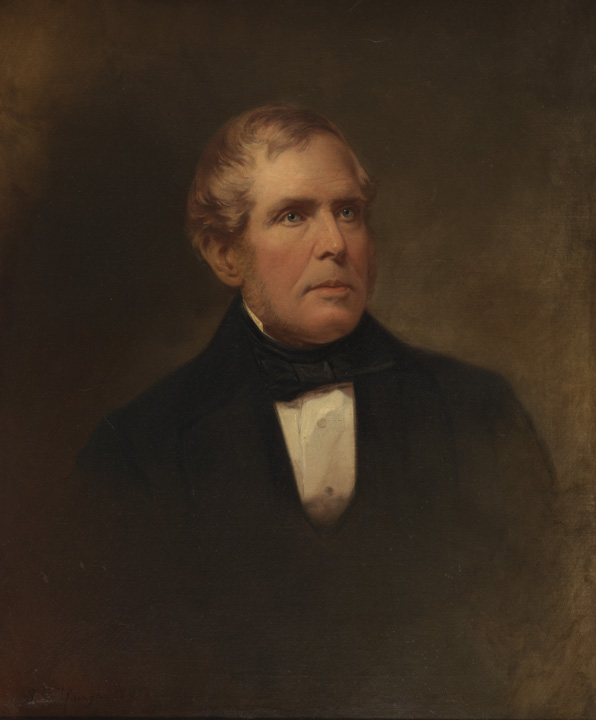
Portrait of Joseph Reed Ingersoll

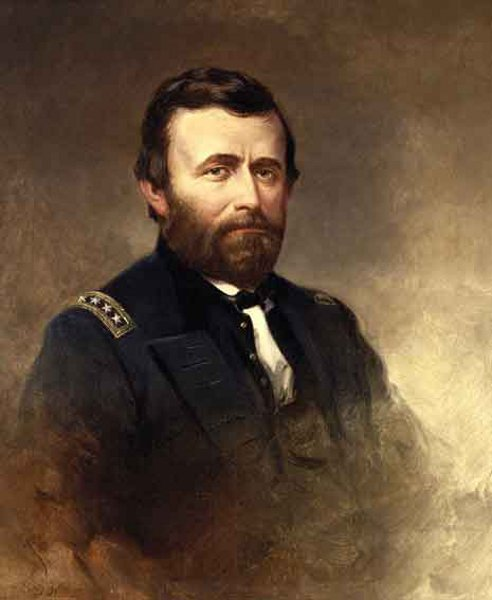
Portrait of Ulysses S. Grant

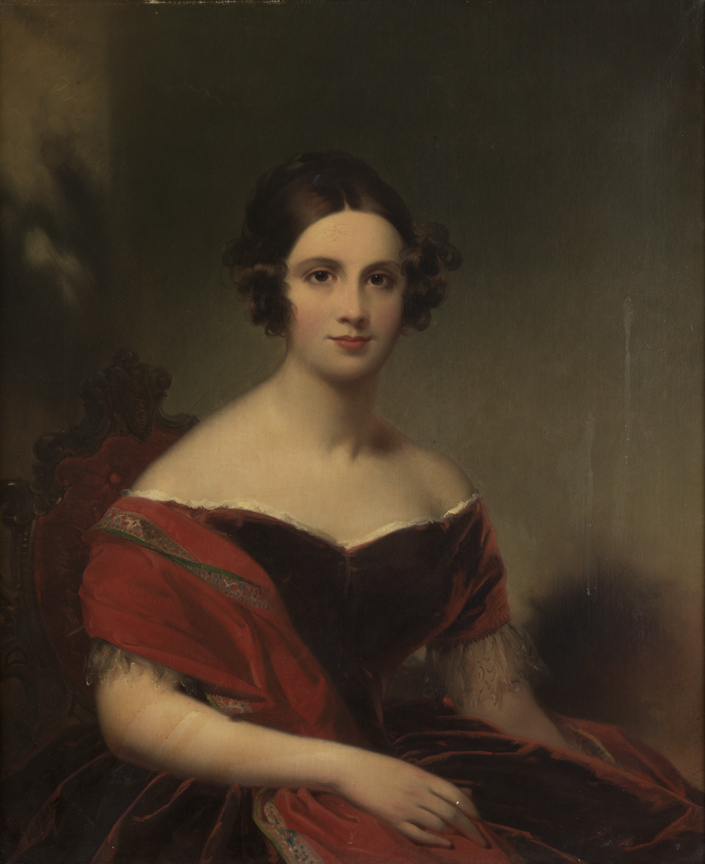
Portrait of Mrs. Henry D. Gilpin

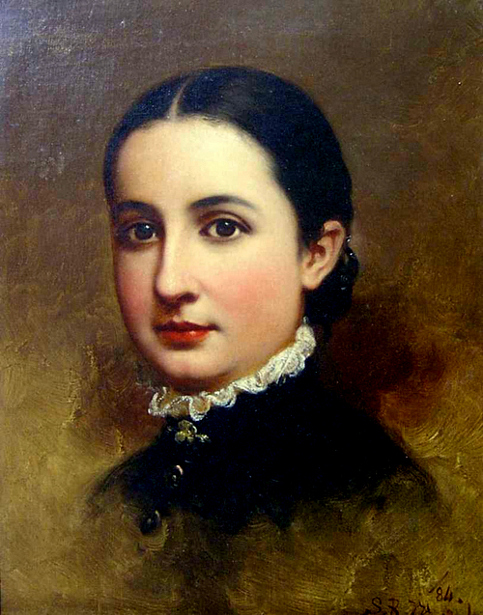
Portrait of Lizzie Markley Hartman

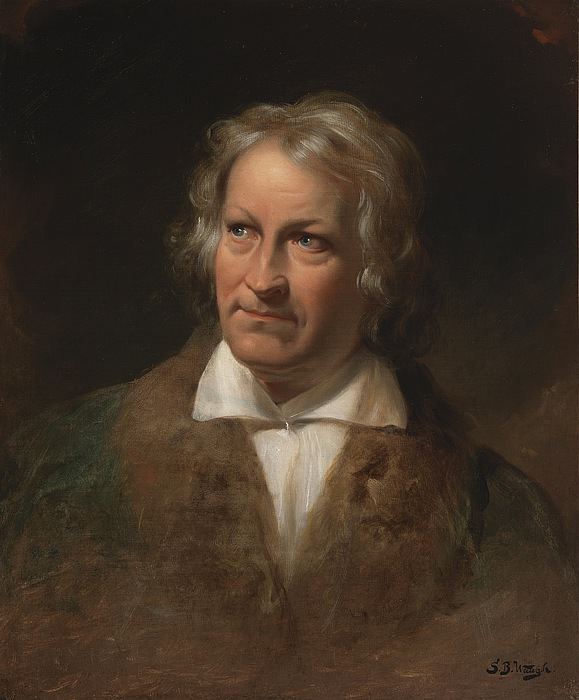
Portrait of Bertel Thorvaldsen
