= Margaret F. Winner =

American artist

Margaret Ferguson Winner (1866 – December 21, 1937) was an illustrator, portrait painter, and miniaturist.

She was born and raised in Philadelphia and held a Fellowship at the Pennsylvania Academy of Fine Arts. Musical composer Septimus Winner was her father.

As a painter, she completed 13 portraits for Dickinson College. The paintings she did of Dickinson presidents hung in Old West and Bosler Hall.

She painted a portrait of John Kirk McCurdy, a Rough Rider, that is part of the permanent collection at the National Portrait Gallery in Washington D.C. She painted Supreme Court Justice Roger Brooke Taney, posthumously, and also painted a portrait of Dr. William Ruoff.

She lived at 1706 North 16th Street.

Her photograph appears in the book Septimus Winner: Two Lives in Music. She was a member of the Art Alliance and Plastic Club.

== Books she illustrated ==
- Her Very Best (1901) by Amy E. Blanchard
- Dearie, Dot, and the Dog (1904) by Julie M. Lippmann
- Mistress Moppet (1904) by Annie M. Barnes
