= Elizabeth Gould =

Elizabeth Gould may refer to:

- Elizabeth Gould (psychologist) (born 1962), American neuroscientist and professor of psychology at Princeton University
- Elizabeth Gould (illustrator) (1804–1841), wife of John Gould and illustrator of The Birds of Australia
- Elizabeth Porter Gould (1848–1906), American poet, essayist, and suffragist
- Elizabeth Lincoln Gould (1862–1914), American author of children's books and playwright
- Elizabeth Gould, coauthor with her husband Paul Fitzgerald of books on the war in Afghanistan and situation in Pakistan as well as a columnist

== See also ==
- Elizabeth Gould Davis (1910–1974), American librarian and feminist
