= Daisies and Raindrops =

Collection of children's stories and poems by Amy Ella Blanchard

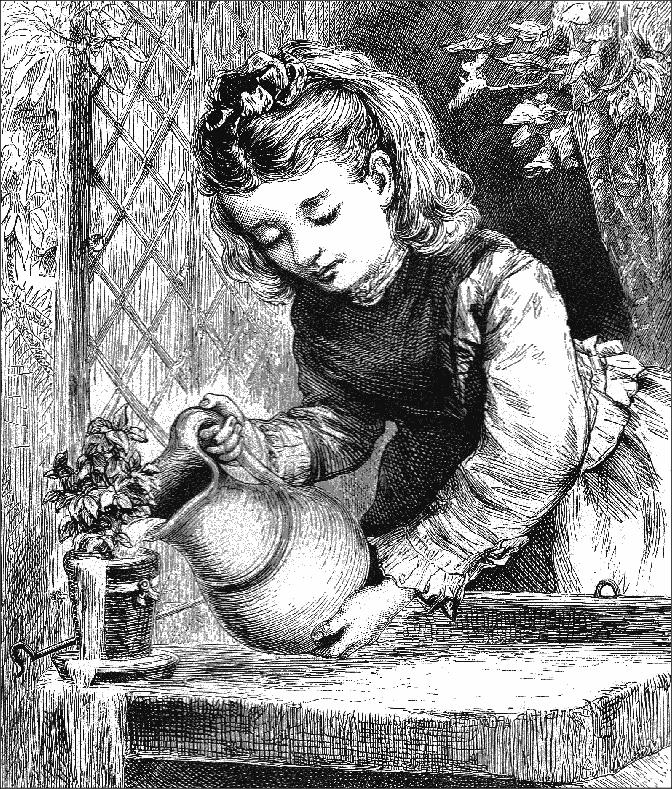
Illustration from Daisies and Raindrops.

Daisies and Raindrops is an illustrated collection of short stories and poems for children by Amy Ella Blanchard. It was first published in 1882 by E.P. Dutton.

This book contains excellent examples of children's illustrations from the "Golden Age" of illustration.

The illustrations from this book of Ida Waugh were used in a collection of sonnets for children, also entitled Daisies and Raindrops, by Scott Ennis.

== Contents ==
- A Family of Daisies
- Raindrops
- Bert's Chinaman
- The Dog That Had No Home
- The Wheelbarrow
- Little Round Dot
- All of Us Kittens
- Alice
- The Flower That Smiled
- Violet and Pansy
