= Helen Sherman Griffith =

American author (1873-1961

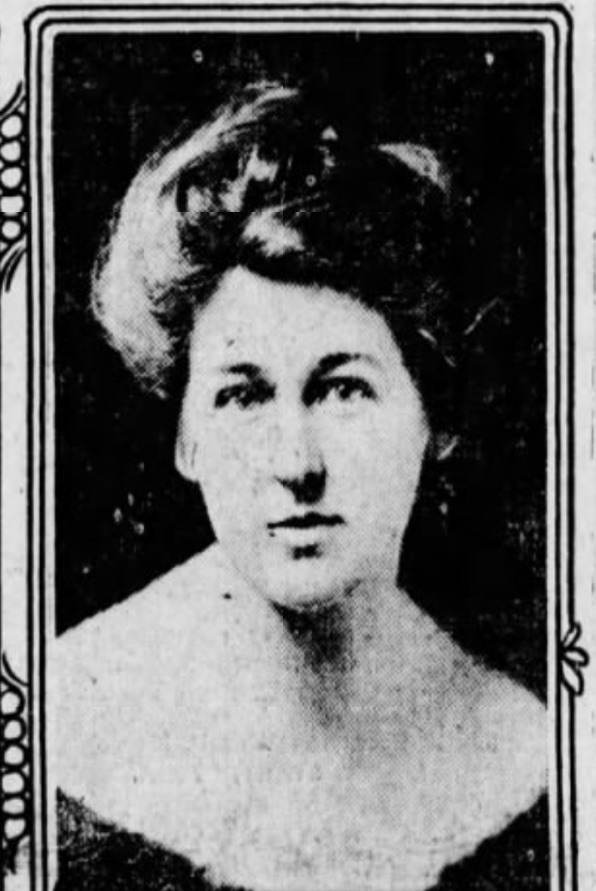
- Born: Helen Sherman; February 6, 1873; Des Moines, Iowa, U.S.
- Died: July 14, 1961 (aged 88); Saynderstown, Rhode Island, U.S.
- Resting place: Old St. David's Church, Wayne Pennsylvania
- Occupation: Author
- Father: Hoyt Sherman
- Relatives: William Tecumseh Sherman (vncle); John Sherman (uncle)

Helen Sherman Griffith (1873 – July 13, 1961) was an American author. An Iowan, she was the "prolific" author of the Letty Grey series of children's books, published by Penn Publishing Company of Philadelphia. She was the daughter of Hoyt Sherman and Sara Sherman, who was born and raised in Des Moines, Iowa at Hoyt Sherman Place. Helen's bedroom has been restored and is part of the Hoyt Sherman Place house museum.

Her father was as a bank president and paymaster for the U.S. Army during the Civil War. She met her husband, the son of a successful cotton broker in Philadelphia, on an around the world cruise.

In 1914 she paid a visit to Des Moines Women's Club which was located in Hoyt Sherman Place, her childhood home. An article in the Des Moines Register captured the occasion: "It was at the close of the program that Mrs. Cowles told the delightful news that the Women's Club... board... had voted to dedicate the auditorium on the second floor of the club house to Mrs. Helen Sherman Griffith. It was the same room the Mrs. Griffith, then known to her friends as Nellie Sherman, passed her girlhood days and dreamed her dreams and wove her fancies - dreams and fancies that have since taken more permanent form in delightful stories of children and young folks."

She wrote three plays in 1899: The Minister's Wife, The Burglar Alarm, and A Borrowed Luncheon. She had quips published in Lippincott's Monthly Magazine. Her novel for adults, The Lane, was a bestseller in the 1920s.

== Bibliography ==
- Her Father's Legacy; A Story for Girls (1901), illustrated by Ida Waugh
- A Story for Girls (1902) illustrated by Ida Waugh
- Social Aspirations (1903)
- For Love Or Money; a Comedy in Three Acts (1903)
- The Merry Widow Hat: A Farce in One Act for Female Characters (1909)
- Reflected Glory: A Farce in One Act (for Female Characters) (1909)
- Letty of the Circus (1910) illustrated by Francis D. Jones Penn Publishing Company
- A Fallen Idol: A Farce in One Act (1911)
- Rosemary for Remembrance (1911), illustrated by Mary Pemberton Ginthier, Penn Publishing Company
- A Wilful Girl (1911)
- Letty's Sister (1912) Penn Publishing Company
- Letty's Treasure (1913), illustrated by Francis D. Jones, Penn Publishing Company
- Letty's Good Luck (1914), illustrated by Francis D. Jones, Penn Publishing Company
- Letty at the Conservatory (1915) illustrated by Paula B. Himmelsbach, Penn Publishing Company
- Letty's Springtime (1916), illustrated by Paula B. Himmelsbach, Penn Publishing Company
- Letty and Miss Grey (1917), illustrated by Paula Himmelsbach Balano. Penn Publishing Company.
- Letty Grey - Heiress (1918), illustrated by Paula Himmelsbach Balano, Penn Publishing Company
- Her Service Flag: A Play in One Act (1918)
- The Knitting Club Meets Or Just Back from France: A Comedy in One Act (1918)
- Getting the Range: A War Play in Ome Act (1918)
- Letty's New Home (1920), illustrated by Francis D. Jones, Penn Publishing Company
- The Over-Alls Club: A Farce in One Act (1920), Walter H. Baker & Co. 978117357718
- Oh, Virginia! (1920)
- No, Virginia! (1921)
- Why, Virginia (1924), illustrated by Wuanita Smith
- Louie Maude (1924)
- The Roly Poly family (1924)
- The Lane (1925) Penn Publishing Company
- Yes, Virginia! (1928)
- Hail, Virginia (1930)

=== Plays ===
- The Minister's Wife (1899)
- The Burglar Alarm (1899)
- A Borrowed Luncheon (1899) She had quips published in Lippincott's Monthly Magazine. Her novel for adults, The Lane, was a bestseller in the 1920s.
- The Ladies Strike, A Play for Girls, in One Act (1921)
