= Wuanita Smith =

American painter, printmaker, and illustrator

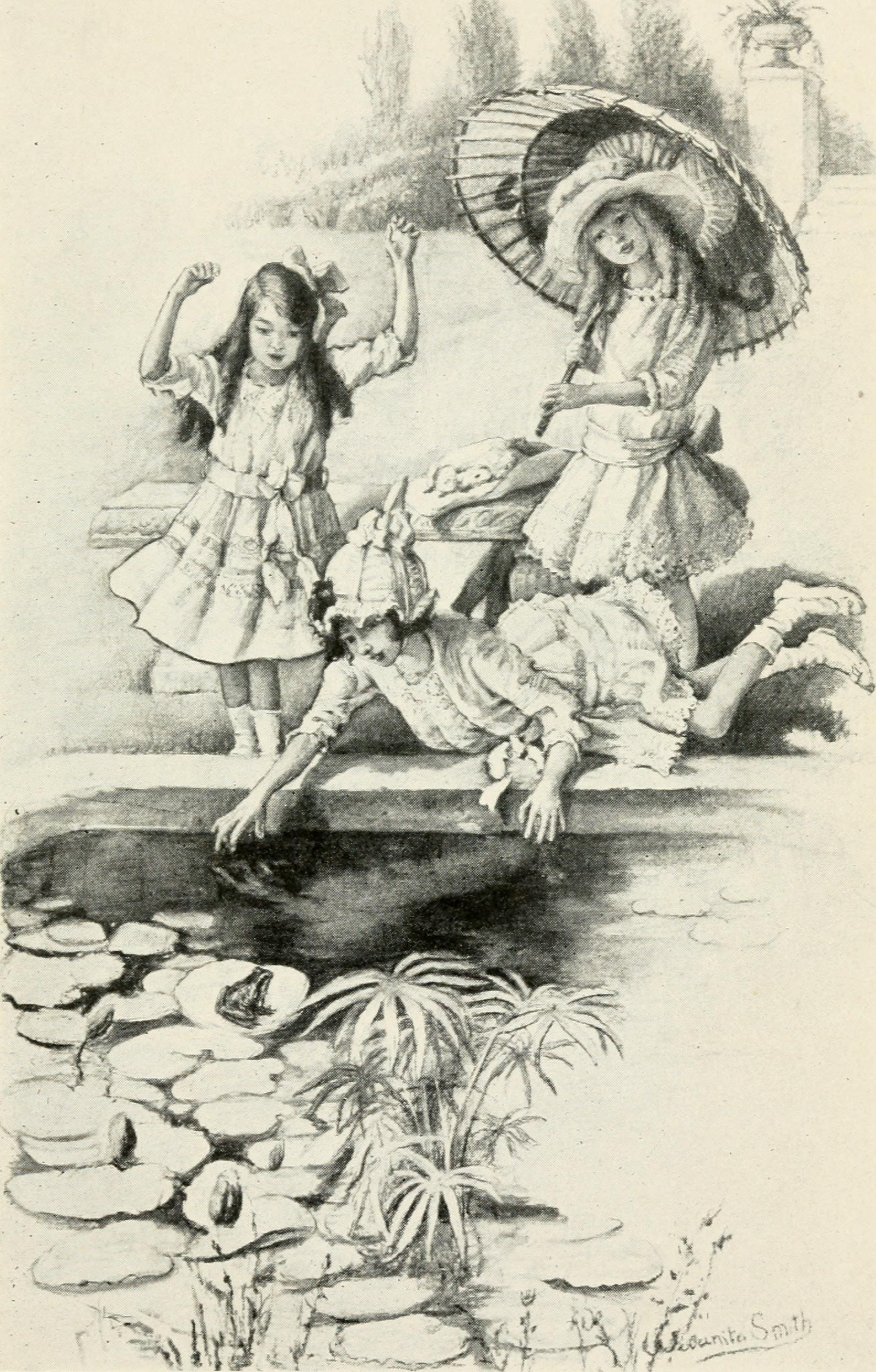
Illustration from Oh, Virginia! (1920)

Wuanita Smith (January 1, 1866 – February 18, 1959) was an American painter, printmaker, and illustrator of children's books. Her work is held in the National Gallery of Art and the Nelson-Atkins Museum of Art.

== Biography ==
Smith was born in Philadelphia on January 1, 1866, and was the daughter of an oil refinery operator. After finishing grammar school, Smith attended and graduated from the Philadelphia School of Design for Women. In 1887, she worked her first job as a jewelry designer.

Smith later attended the Pennsylvania Academy of the Fine Arts and the Drexel Institute. She studied with Howard Pyle, Hugh Breckenridge, Ralph Pearson and exhibited at Drexel Institute of Art, Science, and Industry along with other female artists. She belonged to The Plastic Club, an arts organization in Philadelphia, Pennsylvania. Her aquatint picture Approaching Storm is at the National Gallery of Art. Her woodcut print Skating is part of the Nelson-Atkins Museum of Art collection.

She died on February 18, 1959, in Philadelphia, at the age of 94.

== Gallery ==
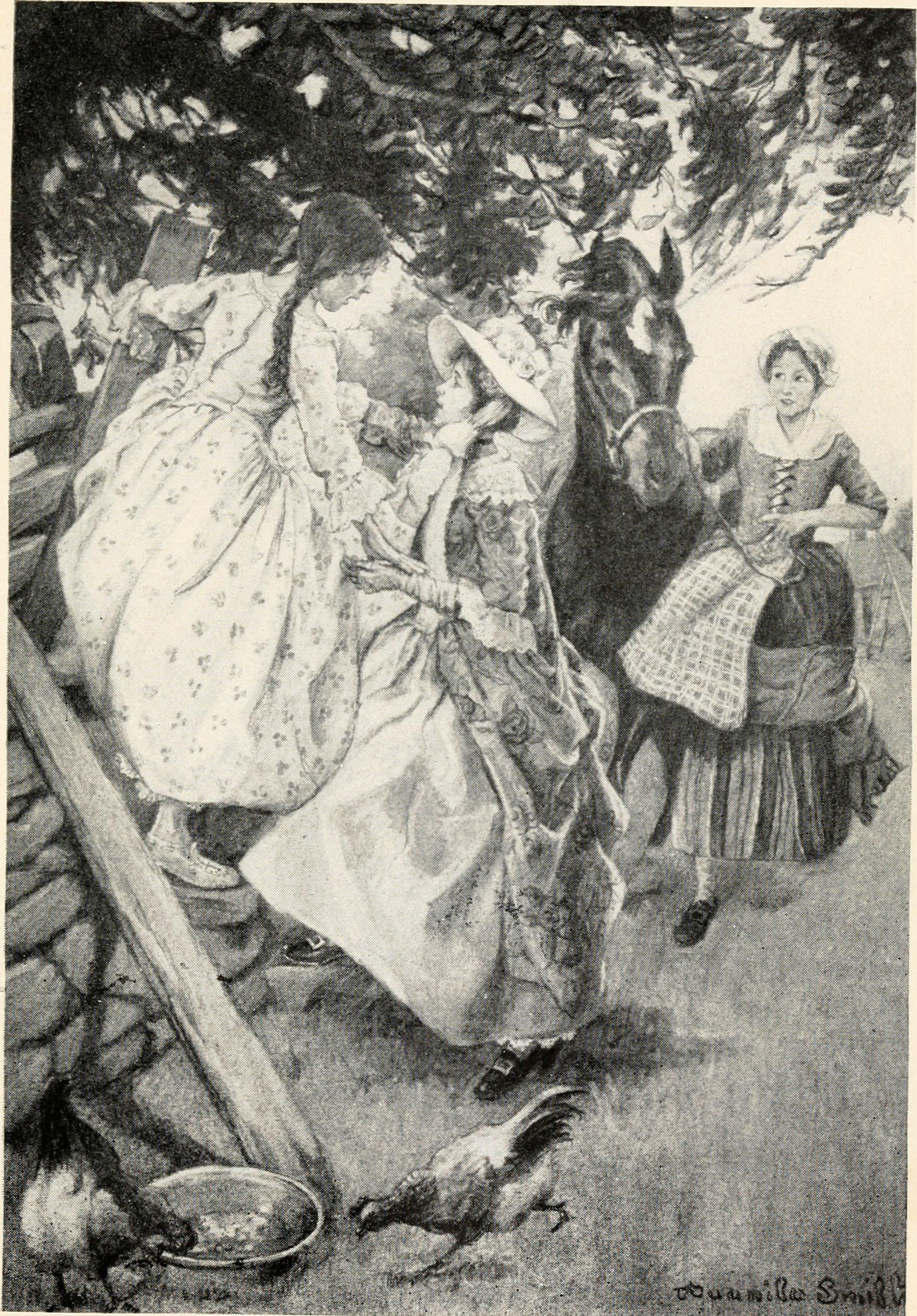
Illustration from A Little Maid of Massachusetts Colony (1915)

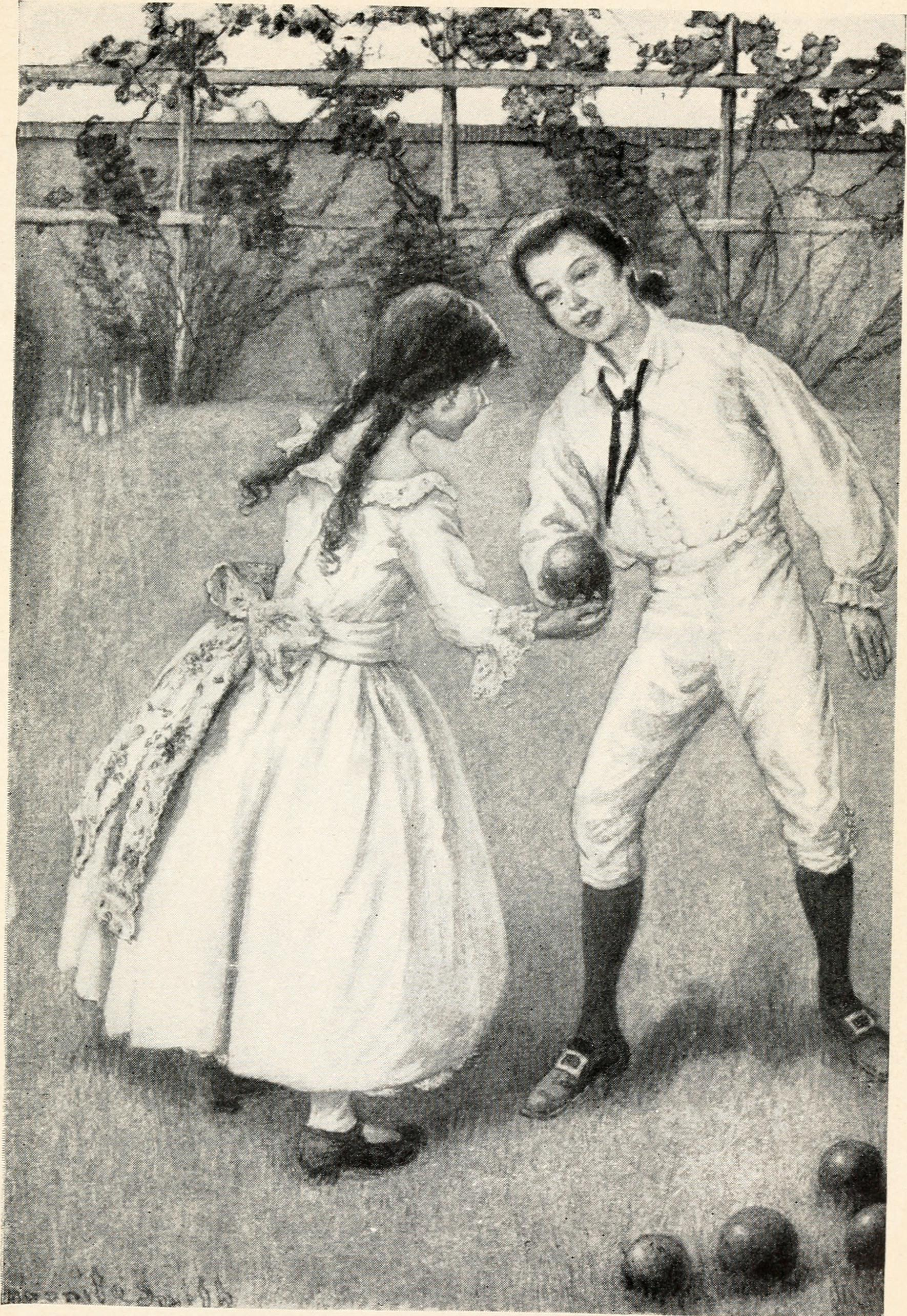
Illustration from A Little Maid of Massachusetts Colony (1915)

== Bibliography ==
- The Four Corners Abroad by Amy Ella Blanchard, part of the Four Corners series, illustrated by Wuanita Smith (G.W. Jacobs, 1909)
- At least three books from the Admiral's Granddaughter Series by Elizabeth Lincoln Gould
  - The Admiral's Granddaughter (1907), illustrated by Wuanita Smith
  - The Admiral's Little Housekeeper (1910), illustrated by Wuanita Smith, about the Beaumont family Christmas
  - The Admiral's Little Secretary (1911), illustrated by Wuanita Smith
- The Little Runaways At Home (1912) by Alice Turner Curtis
- A Little Maid of Massachusetts Colony (1915)
- Oh, Virginia! (1920) by Helen Sherman Griffith
- Brothers Grimm and other stories (1922)
- Grandpa's Little Girls and Their Friends (1925) by Alice Turner Curtis
