= Septimus Winner =

American songwriter (1827–1905)

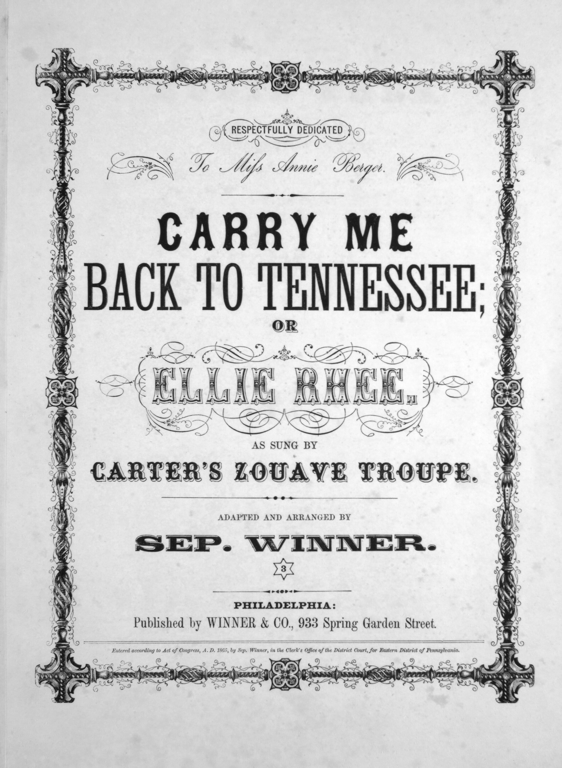

Septimus Winner (May 11, 1827 – November 22, 1905) was an American songwriter of the 19th century. He used his own name, and also the pseudonyms Alice Hawthorne, Percy Guyer, Mark Mason, Apsley Street, and Paul Stenton. He was also a teacher, performer, and music publisher.

== Biography ==
Winner was born in Philadelphia, Pennsylvania, the seventh child to Joseph E. Winner (an instrument maker specializing in violins) and wife Mary Ann. Mary Ann Winner was a relative of Nathaniel Hawthorne, hence Septimus' use of the Hawthorne name as part of his pseudonym Alice Hawthorne.

Winner attended Philadelphia Central High School. Although largely self-taught in the area of music, he did take lessons from Leopold Meignen around 1853, but by that time he was already an established instrumental teacher, and performed locally with various ensembles.

From around 1845 to 1854, Septimus Winner partnered with his brother Joseph Eastburn Winner (1837–1918) as music publishers. Septimus continued in the business with various partners and names until 1902.

Winner was especially popular for his ballads published under the pseudonym of Alice Hawthorne, which became known generically as "Hawthorne's Ballads". His brother was also a composer, publishing under the alias Eastburn. Septimus Winner was inducted into the Songwriters Hall of Fame in 1970.

In addition to composing popular songs, Winner also produced more than 200 instruction method books for more than twenty-three instruments. He wrote more than 1,500 easy arrangements for various instruments and almost 2,000 arrangements for violin and piano.

== Songs ==
In 1855, Winner published the song "Listen to the Mockingbird" under the Alice Hawthorne name. He had arranged and added words to a tune by local singer/guitarist Richard Milburn, an employee, whom he credited. Later he sold the rights, reputedly for five dollars, and subsequent publications omitted Milburn's name from the credits. The song was indeed a winner, selling about 15 million copies in the United States alone.

Another of his successes, and still familiar, is "Der Deitcher's Dog", or "Oh Where, oh Where Ish Mine Little Dog Gone", a text that Winner set to the German folk tune "In Lauterbach hab' ich mein' Strumpf verlor'n" in 1864, which recorded massive sales during Winner's lifetime.

The first verse of "Der Deitcher's Dog" is particularly noteworthy as its first verse has become a popular nursery rhyme:

Oh, where, oh, where has my little dog gone?
Oh, where, oh, where can he be?
With his ears cut short, and his tail cut long,
Oh, where, oh, where can he be?

Modern versions occasionally change "cut" to "so". The song is popularly known as Spike Bulldog's leitmotif in the Tom & Jerry series.

The original song is written in German dialect Pennsylvania "Dutch"), and subsequent verses praise lager, but lament the fact that "mit no money", drinking it is not possible, and praise sausages and thence to speculate on the fate of the missing dog:

Dey makes un mit dog und dey makes em mit horse,
I guess dey makes em mit he

Another of Winner's best-remembered songs, "Ten Little Injuns", was originally published in 1864. This was adapted, possibly by Frank J. Green in 1868 as "Ten Little Niggers" and became a standard of the blackface minstrel shows. It was sung by Christy's Minstrels and became widely known in Europe, where it was used by Agatha Christie in her 1939 novel And Then There Were None, about 10 killings on a remote island. In 2005, film historian Richard Finegan identified Winner as the composer of The Three Stooges song "Swingin' the Alphabet" featured in their 1938 film Violent Is the Word for Curly. Winner had originally published it in 1875 as "The Spelling Bee".

In 1862, Winner was court-martialed and briefly jailed, accused of treason, because he wrote and published a song entitled "Give Us Back Our Old Commander: Little Mac, the People's Pride". It concerned General George B. McClellan, whom President Abraham Lincoln had just fired from the command of the Army of the Potomac. McClellan was a popular man, and his supporters bought more than 80,000 copies of the song in its first two days of publication. He was released from arrest after promising to destroy all of the remaining copies. Shortly after his release, he wrote, "Oh Where, oh Where Ish Mine Little Dog Gone". The song reappeared in 1864 when McClellan was a presidential candidate. In 1880, the words were rewritten as a campaign ditty on behalf of Ulysses S. Grant.

Winner's 1865 love song of the American Civil War, Sweet Ellie Rhee (or "Carry Me Back to Tennessee"), is widely considered to have been introduced to South Africa by Americans working in the Transvaal gold mines, and to have greatly influenced the well-known Afrikaans song Sarie Marais.

Sweet Ellie Rhee, so dear to me
Is lost forever more
Our home was down in Tennessee
Before this cruel war
Then carry me back to Tennessee
Back where I long to be
Amid the fields of yellow corn
To my darling Ellie Rhee

== Personal life ==
Artist Margaret F. Winner was his youngest daughter.

=== Songs ===
The most popular Septimus Winner songs include:

- "How Sweet Are the Roses" (1850)
- "I Set My Heart Upon a Flower" (1854)
- "What Is Home Without a Mother" (1854)
- "Listen to the Mockingbird" (1855)
- "Abraham's Daughter" or "Raw Recruits" (1861)
- "Der Deitcher's Dog" (1864)
- "Ellie Rhee" or "Carry Me Back to Tennessee" (1865)
- "What Care I?" (1866)
- "Whispering Hope" (1868)
- "Ten Little Injuns" (1868)
- "The Birdies' Ball" (1869)
- "Come Where the Woodbine Twineth" (1870)
- "Love Once Gone Is Lost Forever" (1870)
