= Florence Elfelt Bramhall =

American conservationist

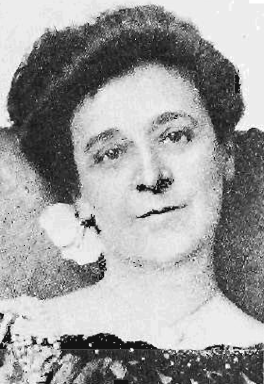
- Florence Elfelt Bramhall, from a 1924 publication
- Born: Florence Adelaide Elfelt; April 2, 1862; St. Paul, Minnesota
- Died: December 22, 1924; St. Paul, Minnesota
- Other names: Florence A. Pyfrom (during first marriage)
- Occupation: Conservationist

Florence Elfelt Bramhall (April 2, 1862 – December 22, 1924) was an American clubwoman and forest conservationist, based in Minnesota. She headed women's club efforts to create the forest preserve that became the Chippewa National Forest.

== Early life ==
Florence Adelaide Elfelt was born in Saint Paul, Minnesota, the daughter of businessman Abram S. Elfelt and Susan Carroll Fryer Elfelt. Her parents were both born in Pennsylvania; her family was Jewish, and her father was a founder and president of the B'nai B'rith Lodge in Saint Paul.

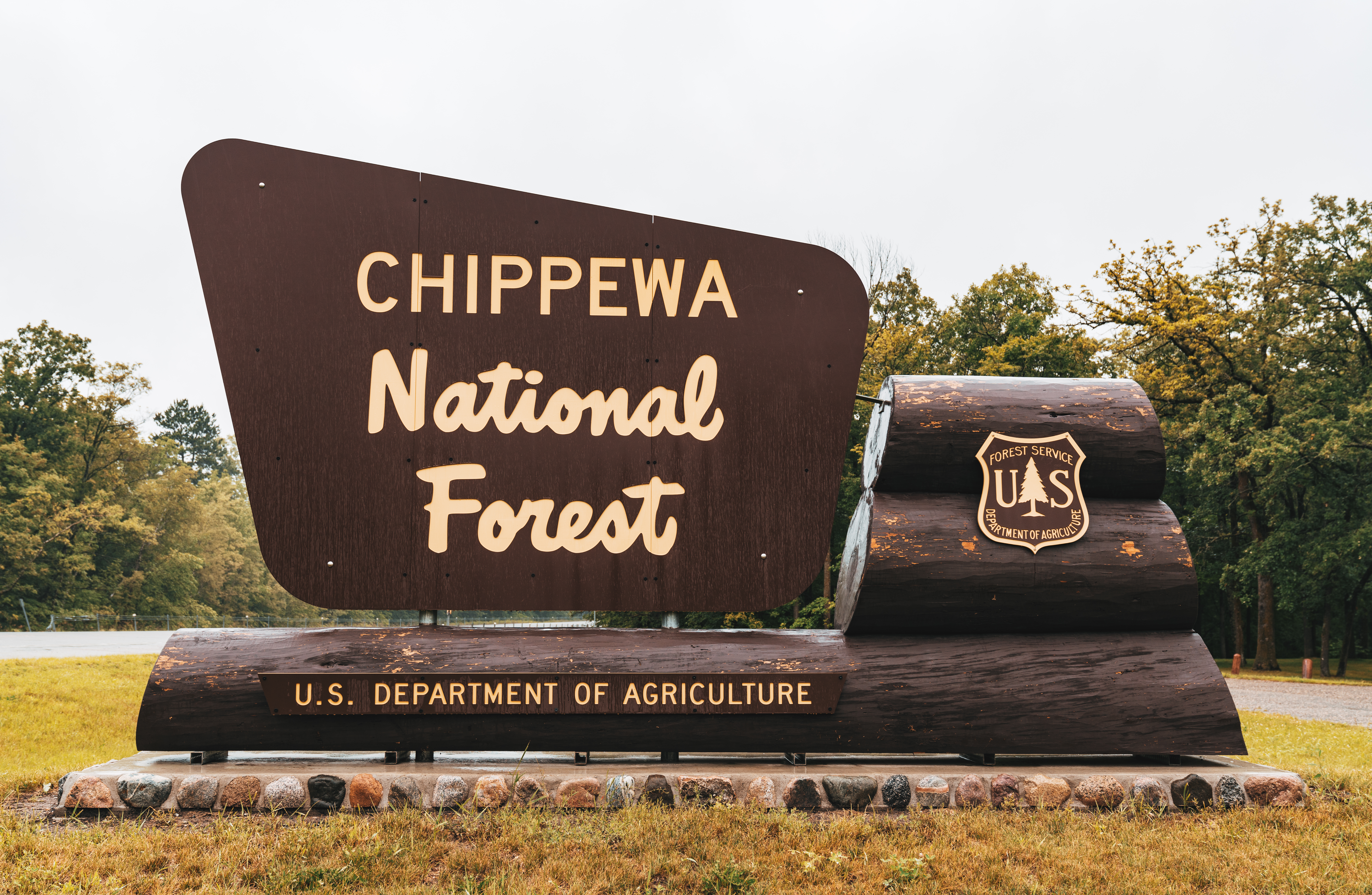
Chippewa National Forest Sign - Minnesota (42661349155)

== Career ==
Bramhall was active in the leadership of the Minnesota Federation of Women's Clubs and president of the Saint Paul Women's Civic League. She worked with the city on building playgrounds, and took a particular interest in forest conservation. In 1901 she spoke before the Minnesota state senate on the subject.

Bramhall and professor Maria Sanford are credited with ensuring the preservation of over 600,000 acres of pine forest in Minnesota, now part of the Chippewa National Forest, the first national forest east of the Mississippi River. In addresses to the State Forestry Association, the State Horticultural Association, and the State Agricultural Association, Bramhall advocated a "forest park" concept, with scientific forestry practices. "It is impossible to think that people can be so blind to their own interests and the interests of the state as to let that magnificent forest be destroyed," she told the St. Paul Globe in 1900.

In 1903 Bramhall declined a nomination for president of the Minnesota Federation of Women's Clubs, preferring not to compete with "even a respectable minority opposition" for the executive post. In 1904, she represented Minnesota state forestry association at a national congress on forestry held in Washington, D.C., when Theodore Roosevelt delivered the address "The Forest in the Life of a Nation."

== Personal life ==
Elfelt married twice. Her first husband was Bahamas fisheries owner Robert Francis Pyfrom; they married in 1883 and divorced a few years later. Her second husband was lawyer William Bramhall; they married in 1888. She died in 1924, aged 62 years.
