= Maria Sanford =

American educator

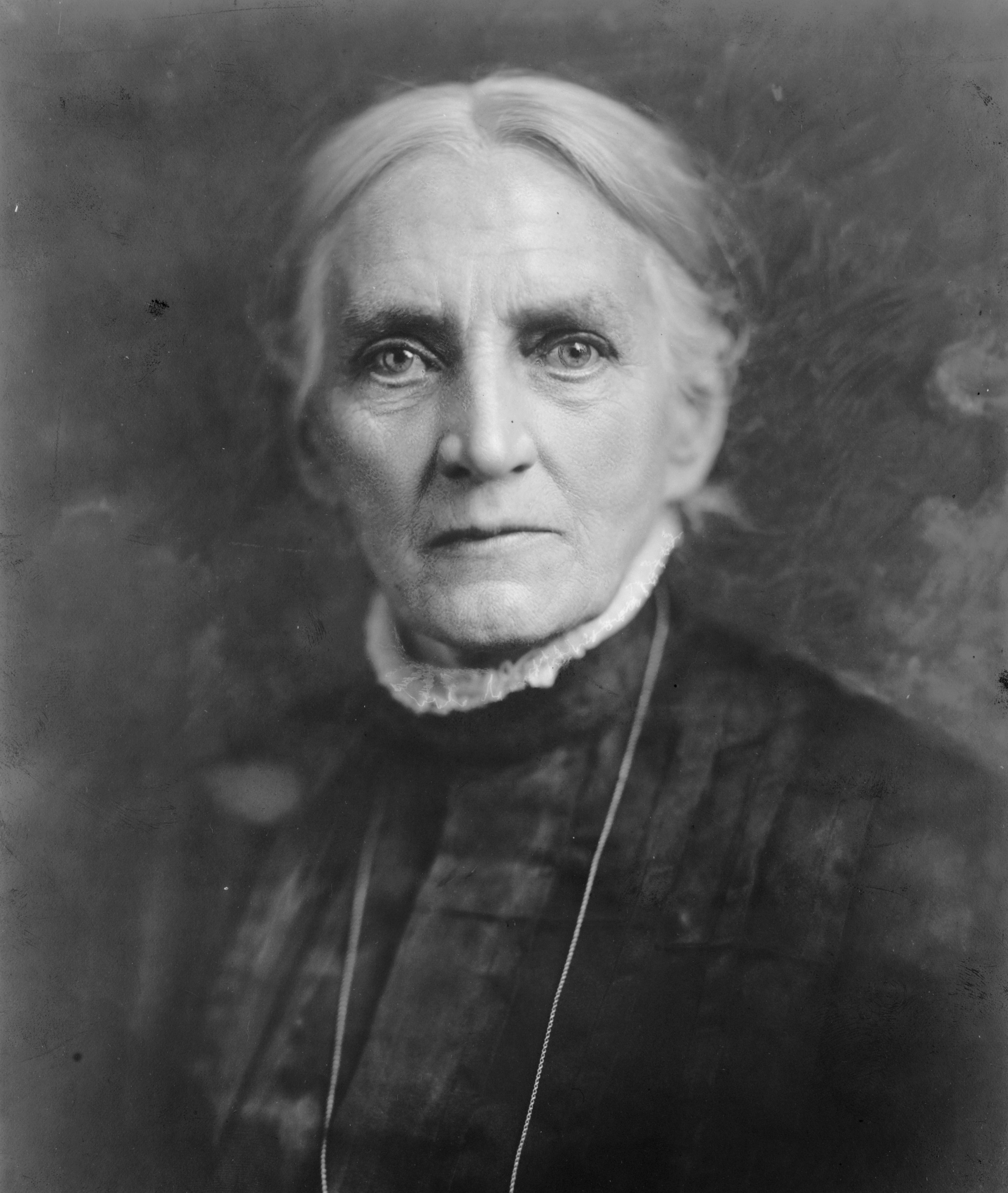
- Sanford, in c.1910
- Born: December 19, 1836; Saybrook, Connecticut, US
- Died: April 21, 1920; Washington, D.C., US
- Occupation: College professor

Maria Louise Sanford (December 19, 1836 – April 21, 1920) was an American educator. She was a professor of history at Swarthmore College from 1871 to 1880 and a professor of rhetoric and elocution at the University of Minnesota from 1880 to 1909.

== Early life and education ==
Maria Sanford was born in Saybrook, Connecticut. Her love for education began early; at the age of 16 she was already teaching in county day schools. She graduated with honors from State Normal School (now Central Connecticut State University), using her dowry funds for tuition.

== Career ==
Sanford rose in the ranks of local and national educators, becoming principal and superintendent of schools in Chester County, Pennsylvania. She took the place of Anna Hallowell and served as professor of history at Swarthmore College from 1871 to 1880. She was one of the first women named to a college professorship. Dr. William Watts Folwell, President of the University of Minnesota at the time, invited Sanford to join the faculty. She did so enthusiastically. Dr. Folwell declared that hiring Sanford was one of his proudest achievements.

During her tenure at the university (1880–1909) Sanford was a professor of rhetoric and elocution, and she lectured on literature and art history. Sanford made strong connections with her students and challenged them with surprise tests and poetry recitations. She held student social events in her Como neighborhood home and gave speeches to organizations and groups across the nation. She was a champion of women's rights, supported the education of blacks, pioneered the concept of adult education, and became a founder of parent-teacher organizations. Notably, however, she resisted universal suffrage until her late seventies.

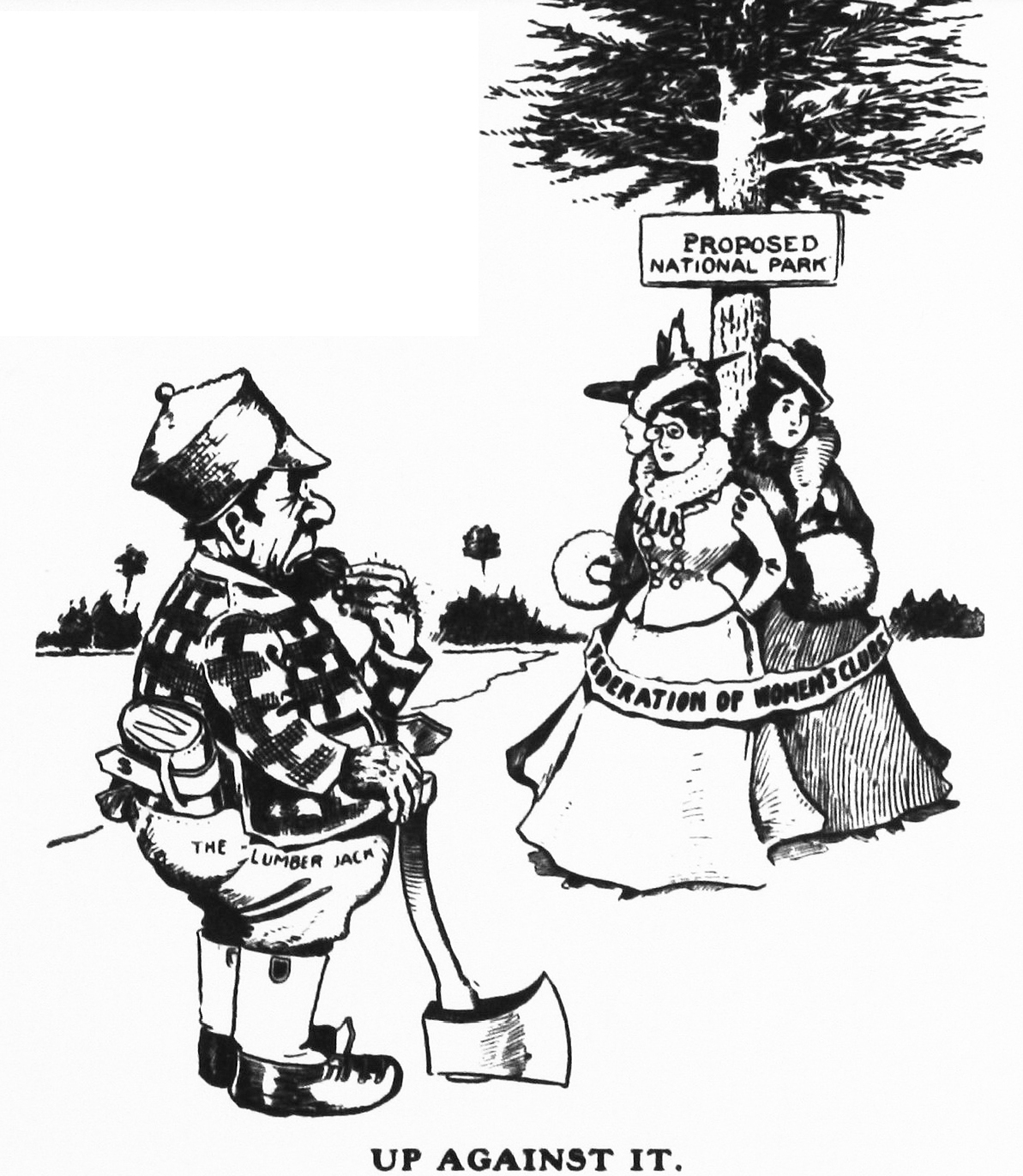
A 1902 cartoon from the Minnesota Federation of Women's Clubs campaign, led by Sanford and Bramhall, advocating wilderness conservation in northern Minnesota

Sanford was also a leader in the conservation and beautification program of her new state, including work with clubwoman Florence Elfelt Bramhall towards creating a forest preserve which became part of the Chippewa National Forest. U.S. Forest Service chief Gifford Pinchot later stated that "without the farsighted and patriotic support of the Minnesota Federation of Women's Clubs, it would have been impossible" to provide this wilderness conservation in Minnesota. Sanford retired from her University of Minnesota professorship in 1909. However, that did not stop Sanford from reaching out to the community and nation with the power of her speeches and public service. She traveled throughout the United States delivering more than 1000 patriotic speeches, the most famous being the powerful address An Apostrophe to the Flag, that she delivered at a national Daughters of the American Revolution convention. Sanford became head director for Northwestern Hospital, and created and served as president of the Minneapolis Improvement League. She served as the Minnesota governor's representative to a national conference on child labor. Sanford publicized and urged public health improvement against trachoma infection blindness among children on Montana Native American reservations. Her address to a 1916 Minneapolis convocation honoring her was headlined as "Trumpet of Social Reform is Sounded by Maria Sanford." She was also picked in 1920 to give a speech at the state celebration of the passing of the 19th amendment.

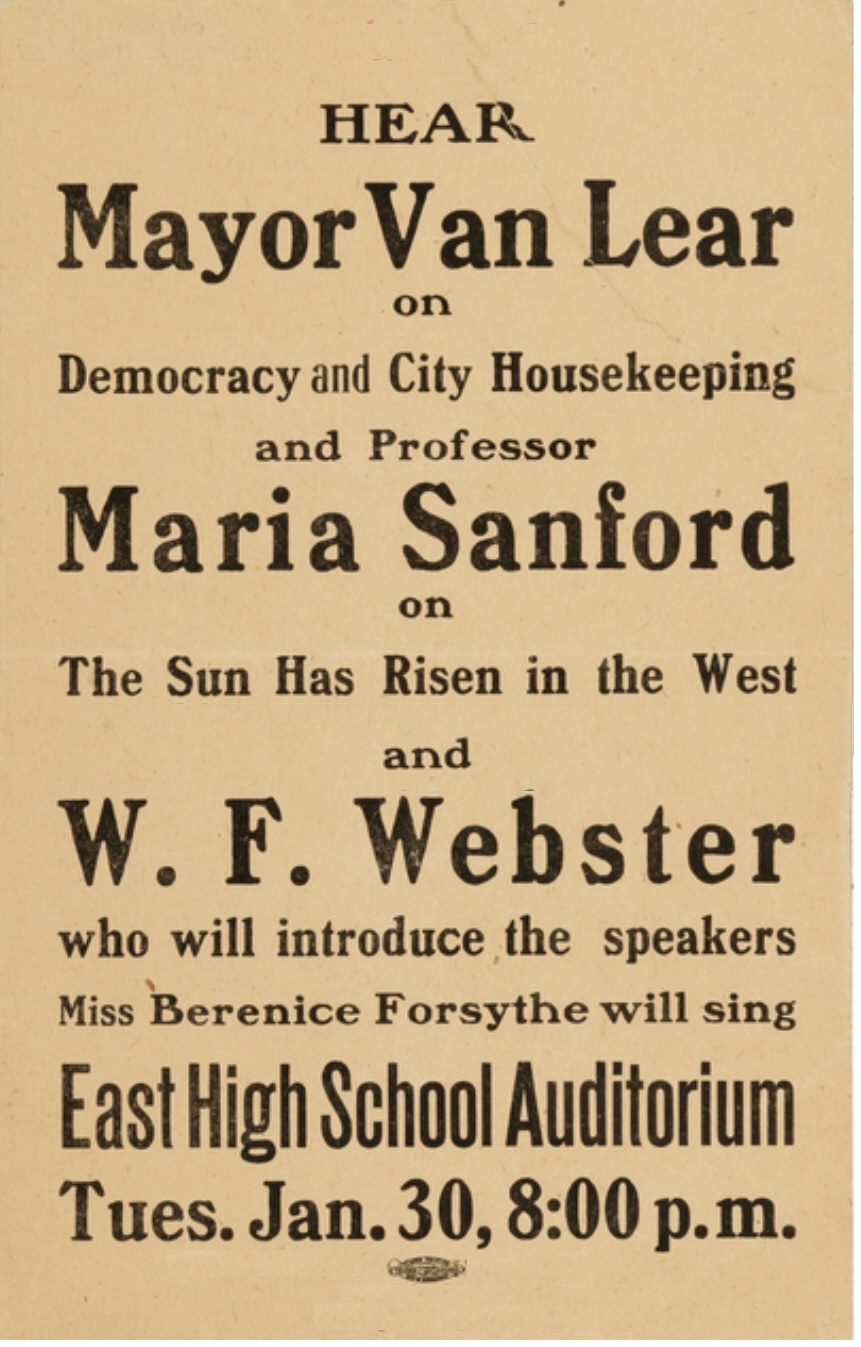
Maria Sanford and Mayor Thomas Van Lear speak on good government and women's suffrage in Minneapolis in 1917

In 1910, the University of Minnesota constructed Sanford Hall in honor of Sanford. In 1964 they expanded the building by adding on a "Tower" to house more students. It was originally built to house the women of the campus. In the 1970s, the hall became coeducational, and housed 502 residents.

== Death and legacy ==
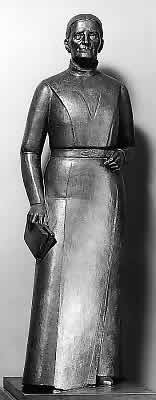
Maria L. Sanford in the National Statuary Hall of the U.S. Capitol Building

Sanford died on April 21, 1920, in Washington, D.C., at the age of 83. In the following months, memorial gatherings were held in her honor at her home church Como Congregational and at her academic home the University of Minnesota. Her death was headlined in Minneapolis Tribune and other newspapers. Sanford was called "the best loved woman of the North Star State."

Sanford is widely commemorated. She was the namesake of a World War II Liberty ship, the SS Maria Sanford, launched in 1943. A school in Minneapolis, Minnesota, was named Maria Sanford Junior High (now called Sanford Middle School) in memory of her. An elementary school in Montevideo, Minnesota, is similarly named Maria L. Sanford Elementary School. Additionally, an academic hall, Maria Sanford Hall, at Central Connecticut State University is named after her. In 1958, the state of Minnesota selected Sanford to represent the state, and donated a bronze statue of Sanford, created by Evelyn Raymond, to the U.S. Capitol's National Statuary Hall Collection.
