= Evelyn Raymond =

American sculptor

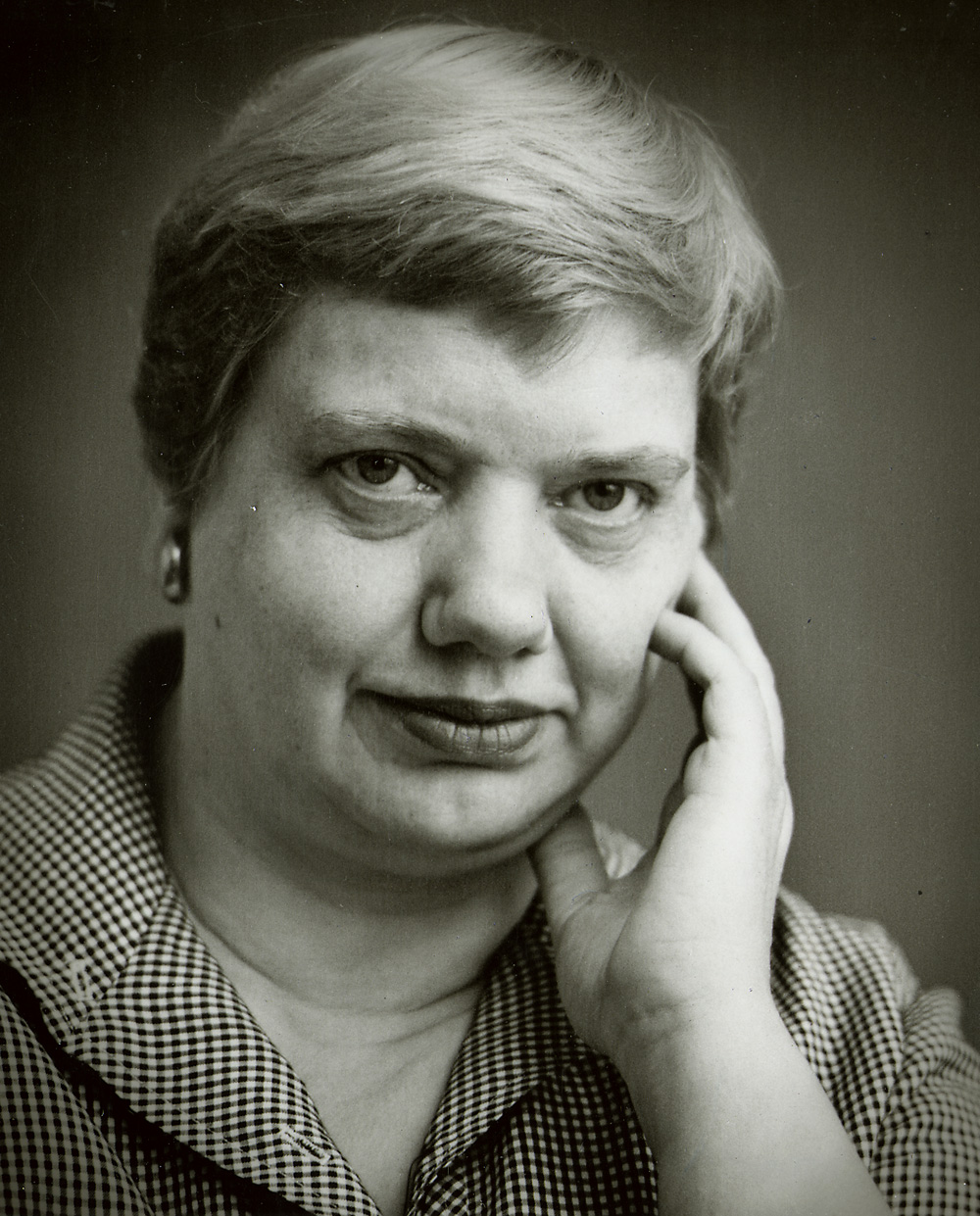
Evelyn Raymond

Evelyn Raymond (March 20, 1908 – April 25, 1998) was an American sculptor. Raymond lived in Duluth, Minnesota. In 1928 she received a scholarship to the Minneapolis School of Art.

== Biography ==
Her teacher at the Minneapolis School of Art was Charles S. Raymond, with whom she studied for two years; from 1930 to 1932 she studied painting under Cameron Booth, and in 1932 she went to New York to study at the Art Students League under William Zorach.

She created work for the Federal Art Project during the Great Depression, and taught from 1939 to 1951 at the Walker Art Center, where she eventually became head of the sculpture department. At one point during the Depression she taught sculpture for 25 cents an hour. She also founded the Minnesota Sculpture Society, of which she served for a time as president, during the 1940s.

When in 1958 the Minnesota Statehood Centennial Commission decided to place a sculpture in the National Statuary Hall collection it was Raymond who was chosen to execute the statue; the resulting depiction of Maria Sanford may still be seen in the United States Capitol. The Walker Art Center and the Minnesota Museum of Art are among the museums holding examples of her work, which may also be found in public collections around the state. Raymond exhibited both alone and in group shows throughout her career.

Raymond's papers are currently held by the Minnesota Historical Society.
