= Julie M. Lippmann =

American writer

Julie Mathilde Lippmann (June 27, 1864 – 1952) was a writer, literary critic, women's suffrage supporter, and political writer. She wrote novels, plays, poetry, literary criticism, and U.S. propaganda during World War I. Her novel Martha By-the-Day was adapted on stage in 1914. The 1919 film The Hoodlum was based on her novel Burkeses Amy.

Lippmann was born in Brooklyn, New York. She was educated at private schools in Brooklyn and by a governess. She traveled extensively.

She was friends with Louisa May Alcott, Charles Dudley Warner, William Gillette, and Mark Twain.

Her stories were published in various magazines. She wrote the lyrics to the song "My Lady Jacqueminot". Lippmann's poems included "If We but Knew", published in 1889, and "Love and Life".

After her death in 1952, her niece, artist and poet Julie Morrow DeForest, wrote the memoir "Auntie": Reminiscences of Julie M. Lippman.

== Bibliography ==
- Dearie, Dot and the Dog (1903), illustrated by Margaret F. Winner
- Sweet P's (1905)
- Martha By-the-Day (1912), her most well known work; she adapted it into a successful play
- Making Over Martha (1913)
- Burkeses Amy (1914)
- Martha and Cupid (1914)
- Amy and the Burkeses (1915)
- Everyday Girls
- The Interlopers (1917)
- The Mannequin (1917)
- Flexible Ferdinand (1919)
- Wildfire
- Dorothy Day
- Jack o' Dreams

=== Plays ===
- Cousin Faithful (1908)
- The Facts in the Case (1912)
- A Fool and His Money (1913)
- Martha By-the-Day (1914)

== Filmography ==
- The Hoodlum
