= Lucy Foster Madison =

American writer and teacher (1865–1932)

- Born: April 8, 1865; Kirksville, Missouri, US
- Died: March 16, 1932 (aged 66); Hudson Falls, New York, US
- Occupations: Writer, teacher

Lucy Foster Madison (April 8, 1865 – March 16, 1932) was an American novelist and teacher.

Born Lucy Foster in Kirksville, Missouri, the daughter of George W. Foster and Almira Parker, she graduated from high school in Louisiana, Missouri. Her father, mother, and brother all died while she was a teen, leaving her to care for her two younger sisters. She became a school teacher in Louisiana, Missouri, then in Kansas City, Missouri. In 1890 she was married to Winfield Scott Madison.

In 1893, the offer of a prize by a New York newspaper interested her enough to enter a short story and she won second place. She became a writer of both short stories and novels, plus a compiler of various Chautauqua assemblies. Her series of "Peggy Owens" stories and other tales for girls were popular early in the twentieth century. Her husband began to suffer ill health, so they moved to a farm near Hudson Falls, New York in 1924. She died there in 1932, a few days after she had a stroke.

== Bibliography ==
- A maid of the first century (1899)
- A maid at King Alfred's court (1900)
- A colonial maid of old Virginia (1902)
- A daughter of the Union (1903)
- A maid of Salem Towne (1906)
- Peggy Owen, patriot: a story for girls (1908)
- Peggy Owen at Yorktown (1910)
- Bee and butterfly: a tale of two cousins (1913)
- Time's follower (1914)
- Joan of Arc: the warrior maid (1918)
- In doublet and hose: a story for girls (1919)
- Peggy Owen: a story for girls (1920)
- Lafayette (1921)
- Peggy Owen at Yorktown (1925)
- Washington (1925)
