= Mabel E. Wotton =

English writer

Mabel Elizabeth Emily Wotton (1863–1927) was an English writer.

== Life ==
Mabel E. Wotton was born in London to Frances Emily and John Stirling Wilmot Wotton, a civil servant. (Note that her Times death notice gives her father's name as Henry Stirling Wotton.) Her older brother Thomas wrote plays, and her younger sister Edith was a publisher's reader.

In 1895, through the actress Irene Vanbrugh, Wotton met Israel Zangwill. Zangwill introduced Wotton's work to the publisher John Lane, who accepted Day-Books for his controversial Keynotes series. Wotton and Zangwill kept up a friendship and correspondence until at least 1920. Zangwill based the character Margaret Engelborne in The Mantle of Elijah on Wotton. Her correspondence with Zangwill shows her connections to London's literary world. She knew George Egerton and Dion Boucicault, and dedicated her story collection Day-Books to Alice Meynell in "gratitute for tenderness". She never married.

Wotton is best known for her New Woman fiction. As well as her adult novels and short stories, Wotton wrote several books for children. She also contributed non-fiction to the Cornhill Magazine, and wrote an appreciation of the actor H. B. Irving.

She died in London on 3 March 1927.

== Works ==
- Word Portraits of Famous Writers. London: Richard Bentley & Son, 1887. Edited by Wotton.
- A Pretty Radical and Other Stories. London: D. Stott, 1890.
- A Girl Diplomatist. London: Chapman and Hall, 1892.
- A Nursery Idyll. London: Society for Promoting Christian Knowledge, 1892.
- A Mannerless Monkey. London: A. D. Innes & Co., 1893. Illustrated by Edith Ellison.
- Day-Books. London: John Lane, 1896.
- On Music's Wings. London: Society for Promoting Christian Knowledge, 1898.
- The Little Browns. London : Blackie & Son, Ltd., 1900. Illustrated by H. M. Brock.
- H. B. Irving: An Appreciation. London: Cassell, 1911.
