= Elizabeth Lincoln Gould =

American author

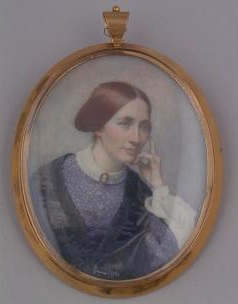
Watercolor on ivory miniature painting of Elizabeth Lincoln Gould ca. 1900 by Laura Coombs Hills

Elizabeth Lincoln Gould (died December 11, 1914) was an American author of children's books and a playwright. She wrote a pair of plays based on the novels Little Women and Little Men by Louisa May Alcott.

Gould grew up in Boston. Her father was a publisher and bookseller. Numerous editions of her books were published.

She wrote children's books. She also composed song lyrics.

The New York Historical Society Museum & Gallery has a miniature watercolor on ivory painting of Gould by Laura Coombs Hills.

Her book Cap'n Gid is about a retired ship's captain who decides to shift from his rural retreat to city life for some new experiences.

== Bibliography ==
- Little Polly Prentiss Series (1903)
  - Little Polly Prentiss
  - Polly Prentiss Goes to School
  - Polly Prentiss Goes A-Visiting
  - Polly Prentiss Keeps a Promise
- A Rose of Holly Court (1903)

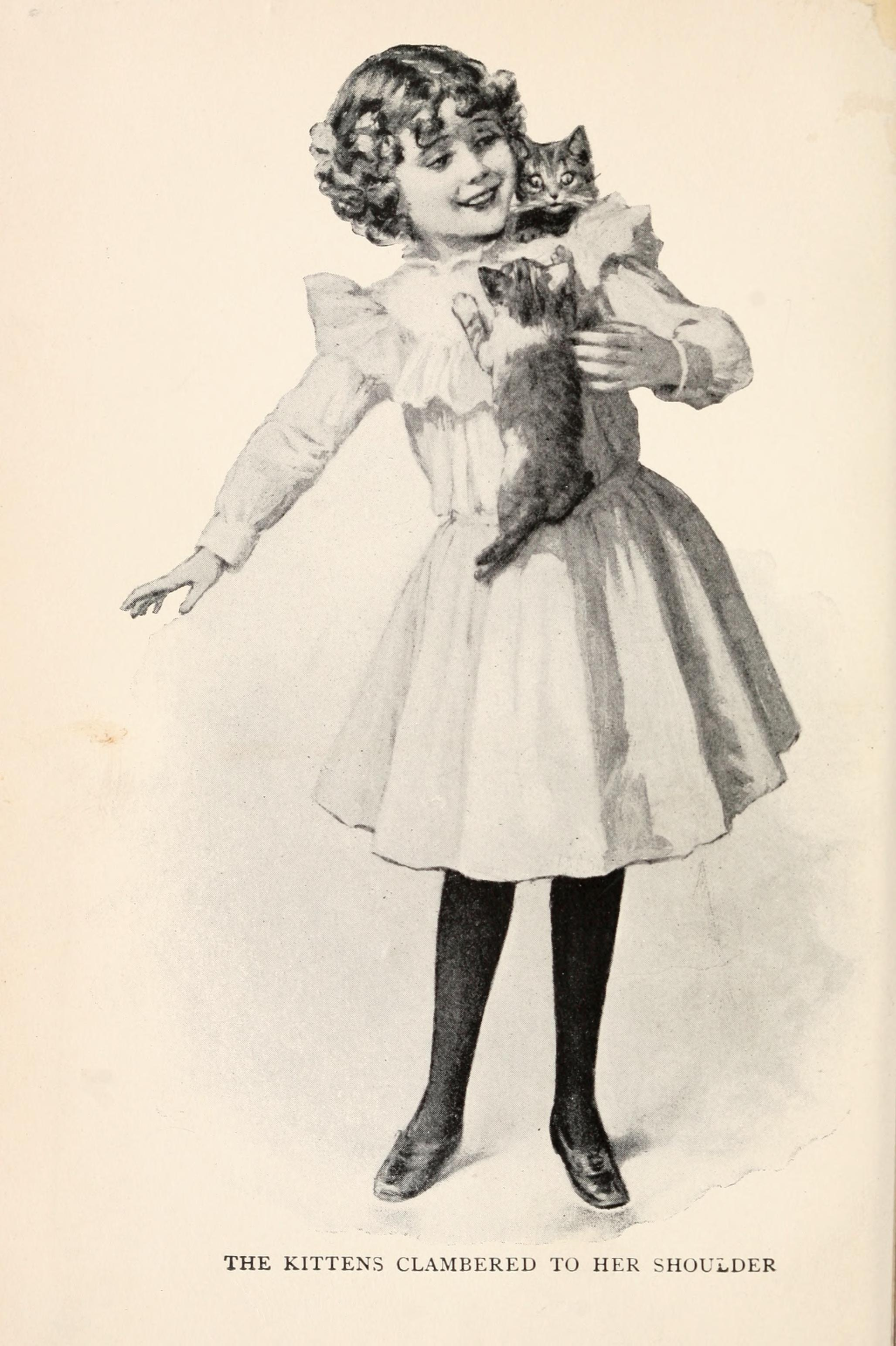
Illustration from Little Polly Prentiss (1902)

- Songs for Tom, Dick, Bob, & Peggy (1905)
- Tales of the Admiral's Granddaughter Series
  - The Admiral's Granddaughter (1907), illustrated by Wuanita Smith
  - The Admiral's Little Housekeeper (1910), illustrated by Wuanita Smith, about the Beaumont family Christmas
  - The Admiral's Little Secretary (1911), illustrated by Wuanita Smith
  - The Admiral's Little Companion (1912)
- Felicia Series
  - Felicia
  - Felicia's Friends
  - Felicia Visits
  - Felicia's Folks
- Grandma (1911)
- Cap'n Gid (1916)
- Out of Doors
- Happy days on the farm
- Farm Holidays
- Little Women (play) illustrated by Reginald B. Birch based on Louise Alcott novel
- Litte Men (play) based on Alcott novel
