= Amy Ella Blanchard =

American writer

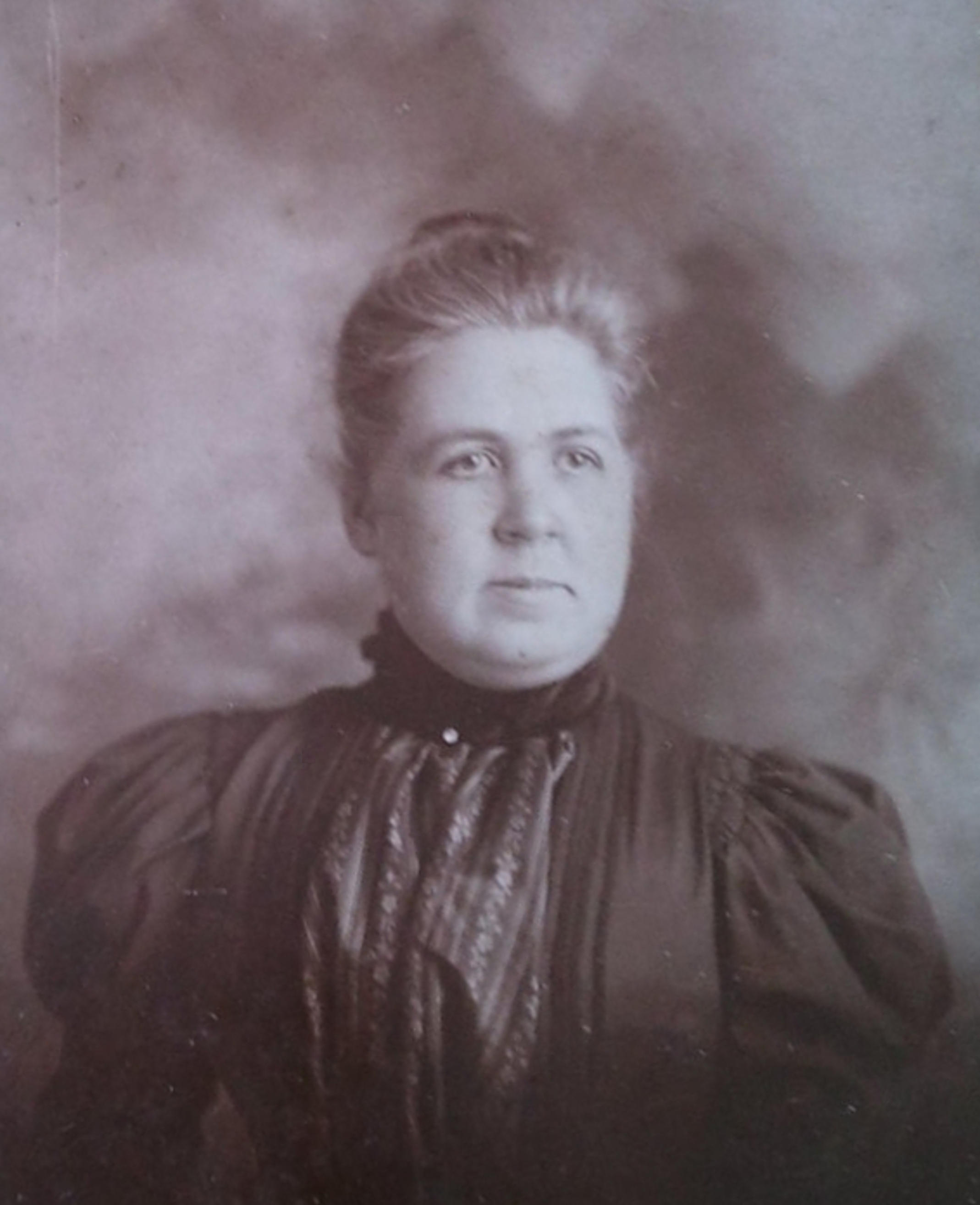
- Amy Ella Blanchard ca. 1900
- Born: June 28, 1854; Baltimore, Maryland
- Died: July 4, 1926 (aged 72); Bailey Island, Maine
- Partner: Ida Waugh

Amy Ella Blanchard (June 28, 1854 – July 4, 1926) was a prolific American writer of children's literature.

== Early life ==
Amy Ella Blanchard was born in Baltimore in 1854, the daughter of Daniel Harris Blanchard and Sarah Reynolds.

She was educated in public schools and then studied art in New York City and Philadelphia.

== Career ==
Amy Ella Blanchard was at first a teacher of art at the Woman's College in Baltimore, now Goucher College. She taught school while studying art. She then taught drawing and painting for two years in Plainfield, New Jersey.

Her first poem was published in a Salem newspaper when she was 16 years old. Three years later she published her first book, but it was not until 1893 that she obtained her first success with her stories.

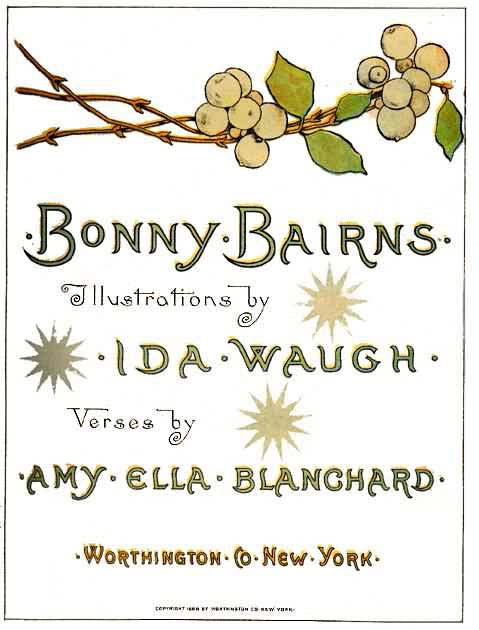
Front cover of Bonnie Bairns (1889) by Ida Waugh

In 1888 she published her first book, and the first collaboration with Ida Waugh, Bonny Bairns, with the Worthington & Co. firm of New York. In this book the usual order was reversed, and the pictures were illustrated with verses. The combination was not only pleasant but pretty. The lithographs were beautifully executed and did full justice to the drawings, which were of a much higher quality than usually appeared in children's picture books. The verses that accompanied them made a pleasant jingle with just sense enough to make them attractive to the chubby critic.

== Personal life ==
Amy Ella Blanchard was a lifelong companion of her artist collaborator Ida Waugh (1846-1919). They met when Waugh was still living with her parents and Blanchard was hired as tutor of Waugh's younger brother, future painter Frederick Judd Waugh.

They lived together in Philadelphia and New York City, their homes a gathering place for authors.

In 1906 Blanchard moved to Washington, D.C. where she lived at 1080 31st Street, N.W. During this period she became a popular writer of girls' books.

Blanchard and Waugh had neighboring summer cottages at Bailey Island, Maine where they helped organize the construction of a chapel in 1916. Winters were spent in Redding Ridge, Connecticut.

From 1923 to 1925 Blanchard won for three successive years the first prize in a national contest promoted by the National League of American Pen Women, of which league she was a member, for the best story written by American women writers.

She died on July 4, 1926, at Bailey Island from apoplexy; she was found by her maid at the desk, a just-completed poem forecasting her own death in front of her. She is buried in Woodlawn Cemetery, Woodlawn, Baltimore County, Maryland, at her own request.

== Works ==
Her works include:

- As Others See Us (publication date unknown)
- The Awakening of Martha (1923)
- Baby Blossom (Worthington Co., 1888)
- Because of conscience: being a novel relating to the adventures of certain Huguenots in old New York (J. B. Lippincott company, 1901)
- Becky: a story, (W. A. Wilde company, ca. 1922)
- Betty of Wye (publication date unknown)
- Bless it, illust. by Ida Waugh (Worthington Co., 1890)
- Bonny Bairns (poetry), illust. by Ida Waugh (Worthington, 1888)
- Bonny Lesley of the border (W.A. Wilde, 1904)
- The butterfly: Verses, illust. by Ida Waugh (Worthington Co., 1890)
- Daisies and Raindrops (poetry), illust. by Ida Waugh (E.P. Dutton & Company, 1882)
- A daughter of freedom: a story of the latter period of the war for independence, (W. A. Wilde Company, 1900)
- A Dear Little Girl (publication date unknown)
- A Dear Little Girl at School (George W. Jacobs & Co., 1910)
- A Dear Little Girl's Summer Holidays (George W. Jacobs & Co., 1911)
- A Dear Little Girl's Thanksgiving Holidays (George W. Jacobs & Co., 1912)
- Dimple Dallas: the further fortunes of a sweet little maid, illust. by Ida Waugh (George W. Jacobs & Co., 1900)
- An everyday girl: a story (W. A. Wilde, ca. 1924)
- Fagots and Flames: A Story of Winter Camp Fires (1916)
- The Four Corners, "Four Corners" series (G. W. Jacobs & company, 1906)
- The Four Corners Abroad, "Four Corners" series, illust. by Wuanita Smith (G.W. Jacobs, 1909)
- The Four Corners at College, "Four Corners" series (publication date unknown)
- The Four Corners at School, "Four Corners" series (publication date unknown)
- The Four Corners in California, "Four Corners" series, illust. by Wuanita Smith (G.W. Jacobs, 1907)
- The Four Corners in camp, "Four Corners" series (G. W. Jacobs & company, 1910)
- The Four Corners in Egypt, "Four Corners" series (G. W. Jacobs & company, 1914)
- The Four Corners in Japan, "Four Corners" series (G.W. Jacobs & company, 1912)
- From Tenderfoot to Golden Eaglet: A Girl Scout Story, (Wilde, 1921)
- A frontier knight: a story of early Texan border-life, also by William F. Stecher (W.A. Wilde Company, 1904)
- A gentle pioneer, being the story of the early days in the new West (W.A. Wilde Company, 1903)
- A Girl of '76, illust. by Ida Waugh (W.A. Wilde Company, 1898)
- A Girl Scout of Red Rose Troop (1918)
- Girls Together (publication date unknown)
- The Glad Lady (Dana Estes & Company, 1910)
- Hearts and clubs: a comedy in three acts (The Penn Pub. Co., 1913)
- Her Very Best (publication date unknown)
- A heroine of 1812: a Maryland romance (W. A. Wilde company, 1901)
- Holly Berries (poetry), illust. by Ida Waugh (1882)
- Ida Waugh's Alphabet Book: For Little Ones Who, If They Look, Will Find their Letters in This Book (poetry), illust. by Ida Waugh (J.B. Lippincott, 1888)
- An independent daughter (J.B. Lippincott Co., 1900)
- Janet's College Career (1904) Philadelphia: George W. Jacobs & Co.
- A Journey of Joy (two girls and their chaperone on a trip through Europe) (1908)
- Kittyboy's Christmas (George W. Jacobs & Co. 1898)
- Life's Little Actions (publication date unknown)
- Little Maid Marian, "Little Maid" series (1908)
- A little maid of Picardy, "Little Maid" series (W.A. Wilde company, ca. 1919)
- Little Miss Mouse (1906)
- Little Miss Oddity (1902)
- A Little Tomboy (1903)
- A loyal lass: a story of the Niagara campaign of 1814 (W. A. Wilde, 1902)
- Mabel's Mishap (1900)
- Mammy's baby, illust. by Ida Waugh (Worthington Co., ca. 1890)
- Miss Vanity(publication date unknown)
- Mistress May, illust. by Ida Waugh (George W. Jacobs, ca. 1901)
- My own dolly, illust. by Ida Waugh (Griffith and Farran, 1883)
- Nancy first and last (J.B. Lippincott Company, 1917)
- Playmate Polly (New York: Hurst & Company, 1909)
- A revolutionary maid: a story of the middle period of the war for independence, illust. by Ida Waugh (W.A. Wilde, 1899)
- A Sweet Little Maid, "Little Maid" series, illust. by Ida Waugh (G.W. Jacobs, 1899)
- Taking a stand (G.W. Jacobs & co., 1896)
- Talbot's angles, illust. by L. J. Bridgman (Dana Estes & Company, ca. 1911)
- Tangles & Curls or Little Boys and Little Girls (poetry), illust. by Ida Waugh (Worthington, 1888)
- Tell Me a Story (poetry), illust. by Ida Waugh (Worthington, 1888)
- Three Little Cousins (1907)
- Three pretty maids (J.B. Lippincott company, 1897)
- Twenty little maidens, illust. by Ida Waugh (J.B. Lippincott Company, 1893)
- Two Maryland Girls (publication date unknown)
- Two Girls (publication date unknown)
- Wee babies: printed in colours from original designs (poetry), illust. by Ida Waugh (E.P. Dutton & Co., 1882)
- Wee tots, illust. by Ida Waugh (Worthington Co., 1890)
- When Mother Was a Little Girl (poetry), illust. by Ida Waugh (Ernest Nister, 1909)
- Wits' end (D. Estes & company, 1909)
- Worth his while (George W. Jacobs, 1901)

She contributed a few titles to the Camp Fire Girls series including:

- The Camp Fire Girls of Brightwood: a story of how they kindled their fire and kept it burning (1915)
- In Camp with the Muskoday Camp Fire Girls (W. A. Wilde company, ca. 1917)
